

160001–160100 

|-bgcolor=#d6d6d6
| 160001 Bakonybél ||  ||  || April 5, 2006 || Piszkéstető || K. Sárneczky || — || align=right | 5.1 km || 
|-id=002 bgcolor=#d6d6d6
| 160002 ||  || — || May 7, 2006 || Kitt Peak || Spacewatch || — || align=right | 4.3 km || 
|-id=003 bgcolor=#fefefe
| 160003 ||  || — || September 27, 2006 || Socorro || LINEAR || — || align=right | 1.2 km || 
|-id=004 bgcolor=#E9E9E9
| 160004 ||  || — || April 11, 2007 || Kitt Peak || Spacewatch || — || align=right | 1.4 km || 
|-id=005 bgcolor=#d6d6d6
| 160005 ||  || — || April 15, 2007 || Catalina || CSS || 3:2 || align=right | 10 km || 
|-id=006 bgcolor=#fefefe
| 160006 ||  || — || April 22, 2007 || Kitt Peak || Spacewatch || — || align=right | 1.1 km || 
|-id=007 bgcolor=#d6d6d6
| 160007 ||  || — || April 20, 2007 || Socorro || LINEAR || HYG || align=right | 5.3 km || 
|-id=008 bgcolor=#d6d6d6
| 160008 || 2007 JJ || — || May 7, 2007 || Mount Lemmon || Mount Lemmon Survey || — || align=right | 5.6 km || 
|-id=009 bgcolor=#fefefe
| 160009 ||  || — || May 6, 2007 || Kitt Peak || Spacewatch || — || align=right | 1.8 km || 
|-id=010 bgcolor=#fefefe
| 160010 || 6699 P-L || — || September 24, 1960 || Palomar || PLS || — || align=right | 1.5 km || 
|-id=011 bgcolor=#E9E9E9
| 160011 || 1098 T-2 || — || September 29, 1973 || Palomar || PLS || — || align=right | 2.6 km || 
|-id=012 bgcolor=#fefefe
| 160012 || 1110 T-2 || — || September 29, 1973 || Palomar || PLS || — || align=right data-sort-value="0.89" | 890 m || 
|-id=013 bgcolor=#d6d6d6
| 160013 Elbrus || 1294 T-2 ||  || September 29, 1973 || Palomar || PLS || — || align=right | 3.4 km || 
|-id=014 bgcolor=#d6d6d6
| 160014 || 3057 T-2 || — || September 30, 1973 || Palomar || PLS || — || align=right | 2.9 km || 
|-id=015 bgcolor=#E9E9E9
| 160015 || 3079 T-2 || — || September 30, 1973 || Palomar || PLS || — || align=right | 1.6 km || 
|-id=016 bgcolor=#fefefe
| 160016 ||  || — || September 16, 1988 || Cerro Tololo || S. J. Bus || — || align=right | 1.5 km || 
|-id=017 bgcolor=#E9E9E9
| 160017 ||  || — || May 1, 1990 || Siding Spring || A. Lowe || GER || align=right | 2.7 km || 
|-id=018 bgcolor=#d6d6d6
| 160018 ||  || — || October 7, 1991 || Tautenburg Observatory || F. Börngen, L. D. Schmadel || HYG || align=right | 4.2 km || 
|-id=019 bgcolor=#E9E9E9
| 160019 || 1994 FE || — || March 19, 1994 || Siding Spring || R. H. McNaught || GER || align=right | 2.8 km || 
|-id=020 bgcolor=#E9E9E9
| 160020 ||  || — || March 23, 1995 || Kitt Peak || Spacewatch || — || align=right | 1.2 km || 
|-id=021 bgcolor=#E9E9E9
| 160021 ||  || — || March 24, 1995 || Kitt Peak || Spacewatch || AEO || align=right | 2.9 km || 
|-id=022 bgcolor=#fefefe
| 160022 ||  || — || December 18, 1995 || Kitt Peak || Spacewatch || NYS || align=right | 2.7 km || 
|-id=023 bgcolor=#E9E9E9
| 160023 ||  || — || November 7, 1996 || Kitt Peak || Spacewatch || — || align=right | 2.8 km || 
|-id=024 bgcolor=#E9E9E9
| 160024 ||  || — || November 10, 1996 || Kitt Peak || Spacewatch || HOF || align=right | 3.6 km || 
|-id=025 bgcolor=#fefefe
| 160025 || 1996 XS || — || December 1, 1996 || Chichibu || N. Satō || — || align=right | 3.0 km || 
|-id=026 bgcolor=#fefefe
| 160026 ||  || — || March 7, 1997 || Kitt Peak || Spacewatch || FLO || align=right data-sort-value="0.73" | 730 m || 
|-id=027 bgcolor=#fefefe
| 160027 ||  || — || October 23, 1997 || Kleť || M. Tichý, Z. Moravec || FLO || align=right data-sort-value="0.91" | 910 m || 
|-id=028 bgcolor=#fefefe
| 160028 ||  || — || March 2, 1998 || Kitt Peak || Spacewatch || FLO || align=right | 1.3 km || 
|-id=029 bgcolor=#E9E9E9
| 160029 ||  || — || March 31, 1998 || Socorro || LINEAR || — || align=right | 3.2 km || 
|-id=030 bgcolor=#E9E9E9
| 160030 ||  || — || March 22, 1998 || Socorro || LINEAR || MAR || align=right | 2.3 km || 
|-id=031 bgcolor=#E9E9E9
| 160031 ||  || — || April 20, 1998 || Socorro || LINEAR || — || align=right | 2.7 km || 
|-id=032 bgcolor=#E9E9E9
| 160032 ||  || — || April 21, 1998 || Socorro || LINEAR || — || align=right | 2.1 km || 
|-id=033 bgcolor=#E9E9E9
| 160033 ||  || — || August 24, 1998 || Socorro || LINEAR || POS || align=right | 7.2 km || 
|-id=034 bgcolor=#E9E9E9
| 160034 ||  || — || September 14, 1998 || Socorro || LINEAR || — || align=right | 3.4 km || 
|-id=035 bgcolor=#fefefe
| 160035 ||  || — || November 18, 1998 || Kitt Peak || Spacewatch || NYSfast || align=right data-sort-value="0.88" | 880 m || 
|-id=036 bgcolor=#fefefe
| 160036 ||  || — || December 8, 1998 || Kitt Peak || Spacewatch || NYS || align=right | 1.1 km || 
|-id=037 bgcolor=#d6d6d6
| 160037 ||  || — || December 22, 1998 || Catalina || CSS || EUP || align=right | 7.1 km || 
|-id=038 bgcolor=#E9E9E9
| 160038 ||  || — || February 10, 1999 || Socorro || LINEAR || — || align=right | 1.8 km || 
|-id=039 bgcolor=#fefefe
| 160039 ||  || — || May 10, 1999 || Socorro || LINEAR || CIM || align=right | 2.2 km || 
|-id=040 bgcolor=#E9E9E9
| 160040 ||  || — || July 14, 1999 || Socorro || LINEAR || — || align=right | 3.4 km || 
|-id=041 bgcolor=#E9E9E9
| 160041 ||  || — || July 14, 1999 || Socorro || LINEAR || — || align=right | 2.0 km || 
|-id=042 bgcolor=#E9E9E9
| 160042 ||  || — || July 14, 1999 || Socorro || LINEAR || — || align=right | 3.2 km || 
|-id=043 bgcolor=#E9E9E9
| 160043 ||  || — || July 22, 1999 || Socorro || LINEAR || MIT || align=right | 5.1 km || 
|-id=044 bgcolor=#E9E9E9
| 160044 ||  || — || September 10, 1999 || Socorro || LINEAR || — || align=right | 2.3 km || 
|-id=045 bgcolor=#E9E9E9
| 160045 ||  || — || September 9, 1999 || Socorro || LINEAR || — || align=right | 1.8 km || 
|-id=046 bgcolor=#E9E9E9
| 160046 ||  || — || September 30, 1999 || Socorro || LINEAR || MAR || align=right | 2.0 km || 
|-id=047 bgcolor=#E9E9E9
| 160047 ||  || — || October 11, 1999 || Socorro || LINEAR || — || align=right | 1.8 km || 
|-id=048 bgcolor=#E9E9E9
| 160048 ||  || — || October 12, 1999 || Socorro || LINEAR || — || align=right | 4.2 km || 
|-id=049 bgcolor=#E9E9E9
| 160049 ||  || — || October 12, 1999 || Socorro || LINEAR || MAR || align=right | 2.4 km || 
|-id=050 bgcolor=#E9E9E9
| 160050 ||  || — || October 4, 1999 || Catalina || CSS || — || align=right | 2.1 km || 
|-id=051 bgcolor=#E9E9E9
| 160051 ||  || — || October 9, 1999 || Socorro || LINEAR || — || align=right | 2.2 km || 
|-id=052 bgcolor=#E9E9E9
| 160052 ||  || — || October 3, 1999 || Socorro || LINEAR || — || align=right | 2.4 km || 
|-id=053 bgcolor=#E9E9E9
| 160053 ||  || — || October 9, 1999 || Socorro || LINEAR || — || align=right | 2.0 km || 
|-id=054 bgcolor=#E9E9E9
| 160054 ||  || — || October 10, 1999 || Socorro || LINEAR || — || align=right | 2.6 km || 
|-id=055 bgcolor=#E9E9E9
| 160055 ||  || — || October 30, 1999 || Anderson Mesa || LONEOS || — || align=right | 2.8 km || 
|-id=056 bgcolor=#E9E9E9
| 160056 ||  || — || October 31, 1999 || Catalina || CSS || — || align=right | 3.7 km || 
|-id=057 bgcolor=#E9E9E9
| 160057 ||  || — || October 18, 1999 || Socorro || LINEAR || — || align=right | 4.0 km || 
|-id=058 bgcolor=#E9E9E9
| 160058 ||  || — || November 3, 1999 || Socorro || LINEAR || — || align=right | 2.8 km || 
|-id=059 bgcolor=#d6d6d6
| 160059 ||  || — || November 4, 1999 || Socorro || LINEAR || — || align=right | 3.3 km || 
|-id=060 bgcolor=#E9E9E9
| 160060 ||  || — || November 4, 1999 || Catalina || CSS || — || align=right | 4.8 km || 
|-id=061 bgcolor=#E9E9E9
| 160061 ||  || — || November 9, 1999 || Kitt Peak || Spacewatch || — || align=right | 3.2 km || 
|-id=062 bgcolor=#E9E9E9
| 160062 ||  || — || November 11, 1999 || Catalina || CSS || — || align=right | 1.5 km || 
|-id=063 bgcolor=#d6d6d6
| 160063 ||  || — || November 10, 1999 || Kitt Peak || Spacewatch || THM || align=right | 2.4 km || 
|-id=064 bgcolor=#E9E9E9
| 160064 ||  || — || December 11, 1999 || Socorro || LINEAR || EUN || align=right | 2.7 km || 
|-id=065 bgcolor=#E9E9E9
| 160065 ||  || — || December 5, 1999 || Catalina || CSS || — || align=right | 2.7 km || 
|-id=066 bgcolor=#E9E9E9
| 160066 ||  || — || December 5, 1999 || Anderson Mesa || LONEOS || — || align=right | 3.3 km || 
|-id=067 bgcolor=#E9E9E9
| 160067 ||  || — || January 27, 2000 || Socorro || LINEAR || — || align=right | 4.6 km || 
|-id=068 bgcolor=#E9E9E9
| 160068 ||  || — || February 2, 2000 || Socorro || LINEAR || INO || align=right | 2.7 km || 
|-id=069 bgcolor=#fefefe
| 160069 ||  || — || February 2, 2000 || Socorro || LINEAR || — || align=right | 1.6 km || 
|-id=070 bgcolor=#d6d6d6
| 160070 ||  || — || February 8, 2000 || Kitt Peak || Spacewatch || — || align=right | 6.2 km || 
|-id=071 bgcolor=#E9E9E9
| 160071 ||  || — || February 10, 2000 || Kitt Peak || Spacewatch || — || align=right | 4.2 km || 
|-id=072 bgcolor=#fefefe
| 160072 ||  || — || February 28, 2000 || Kitt Peak || Spacewatch || — || align=right | 1.2 km || 
|-id=073 bgcolor=#fefefe
| 160073 ||  || — || February 29, 2000 || Socorro || LINEAR || FLO || align=right | 1.2 km || 
|-id=074 bgcolor=#fefefe
| 160074 ||  || — || March 11, 2000 || Anderson Mesa || LONEOS || — || align=right | 1.3 km || 
|-id=075 bgcolor=#fefefe
| 160075 ||  || — || March 29, 2000 || Socorro || LINEAR || — || align=right | 1.6 km || 
|-id=076 bgcolor=#d6d6d6
| 160076 ||  || — || April 5, 2000 || Socorro || LINEAR || — || align=right | 4.3 km || 
|-id=077 bgcolor=#fefefe
| 160077 ||  || — || April 5, 2000 || Socorro || LINEAR || — || align=right | 1.0 km || 
|-id=078 bgcolor=#fefefe
| 160078 ||  || — || April 6, 2000 || Anderson Mesa || LONEOS || — || align=right | 1.5 km || 
|-id=079 bgcolor=#fefefe
| 160079 ||  || — || April 5, 2000 || Anderson Mesa || LONEOS || V || align=right data-sort-value="0.94" | 940 m || 
|-id=080 bgcolor=#fefefe
| 160080 ||  || — || April 27, 2000 || Socorro || LINEAR || — || align=right | 1.5 km || 
|-id=081 bgcolor=#fefefe
| 160081 ||  || — || May 7, 2000 || Socorro || LINEAR || — || align=right | 2.4 km || 
|-id=082 bgcolor=#fefefe
| 160082 ||  || — || May 24, 2000 || Anderson Mesa || LONEOS || — || align=right | 1.3 km || 
|-id=083 bgcolor=#fefefe
| 160083 ||  || — || May 30, 2000 || Anderson Mesa || LONEOS || — || align=right | 1.3 km || 
|-id=084 bgcolor=#E9E9E9
| 160084 ||  || — || May 27, 2000 || Socorro || LINEAR || — || align=right | 2.5 km || 
|-id=085 bgcolor=#FA8072
| 160085 ||  || — || June 5, 2000 || Socorro || LINEAR || — || align=right | 1.8 km || 
|-id=086 bgcolor=#fefefe
| 160086 ||  || — || June 7, 2000 || Socorro || LINEAR || — || align=right | 3.5 km || 
|-id=087 bgcolor=#fefefe
| 160087 ||  || — || July 4, 2000 || Anderson Mesa || LONEOS || PHO || align=right | 3.2 km || 
|-id=088 bgcolor=#fefefe
| 160088 ||  || — || July 4, 2000 || Anderson Mesa || LONEOS || — || align=right | 1.5 km || 
|-id=089 bgcolor=#fefefe
| 160089 ||  || — || July 30, 2000 || Socorro || LINEAR || — || align=right | 2.1 km || 
|-id=090 bgcolor=#fefefe
| 160090 ||  || — || July 30, 2000 || Socorro || LINEAR || CHL || align=right | 3.5 km || 
|-id=091 bgcolor=#C2E0FF
| 160091 ||  || — || July 29, 2000 || Cerro Tololo || M. W. Buie, S. D. Kern || cubewano (cold)mooncritical || align=right | 180 km || 
|-id=092 bgcolor=#FA8072
| 160092 ||  || — || August 5, 2000 || Haleakala || NEAT || — || align=right | 3.4 km || 
|-id=093 bgcolor=#fefefe
| 160093 ||  || — || August 24, 2000 || Socorro || LINEAR || NYS || align=right | 1.1 km || 
|-id=094 bgcolor=#fefefe
| 160094 ||  || — || August 28, 2000 || Socorro || LINEAR || V || align=right | 1.2 km || 
|-id=095 bgcolor=#fefefe
| 160095 ||  || — || August 28, 2000 || Socorro || LINEAR || — || align=right | 1.5 km || 
|-id=096 bgcolor=#fefefe
| 160096 ||  || — || August 25, 2000 || Socorro || LINEAR || V || align=right | 1.3 km || 
|-id=097 bgcolor=#fefefe
| 160097 ||  || — || August 31, 2000 || Socorro || LINEAR || V || align=right | 1.4 km || 
|-id=098 bgcolor=#fefefe
| 160098 ||  || — || August 31, 2000 || Socorro || LINEAR || V || align=right | 1.3 km || 
|-id=099 bgcolor=#fefefe
| 160099 ||  || — || August 31, 2000 || Socorro || LINEAR || V || align=right | 1.3 km || 
|-id=100 bgcolor=#fefefe
| 160100 || 2000 RD || — || September 1, 2000 || Socorro || LINEAR || PHO || align=right | 2.1 km || 
|}

160101–160200 

|-bgcolor=#fefefe
| 160101 ||  || — || September 1, 2000 || Socorro || LINEAR || ERI || align=right | 3.4 km || 
|-id=102 bgcolor=#fefefe
| 160102 ||  || — || September 2, 2000 || Socorro || LINEAR || NYS || align=right | 1.3 km || 
|-id=103 bgcolor=#fefefe
| 160103 ||  || — || September 6, 2000 || Socorro || LINEAR || — || align=right | 2.4 km || 
|-id=104 bgcolor=#fefefe
| 160104 ||  || — || September 23, 2000 || Socorro || LINEAR || — || align=right | 3.8 km || 
|-id=105 bgcolor=#fefefe
| 160105 Gobi ||  ||  || September 26, 2000 || Colleverde || V. S. Casulli || V || align=right | 1.4 km || 
|-id=106 bgcolor=#fefefe
| 160106 ||  || — || September 24, 2000 || Socorro || LINEAR || — || align=right | 1.7 km || 
|-id=107 bgcolor=#fefefe
| 160107 ||  || — || September 23, 2000 || Socorro || LINEAR || ERI || align=right | 3.8 km || 
|-id=108 bgcolor=#fefefe
| 160108 ||  || — || September 24, 2000 || Socorro || LINEAR || — || align=right | 1.4 km || 
|-id=109 bgcolor=#fefefe
| 160109 ||  || — || September 24, 2000 || Socorro || LINEAR || NYS || align=right | 1.3 km || 
|-id=110 bgcolor=#fefefe
| 160110 ||  || — || September 24, 2000 || Socorro || LINEAR || NYS || align=right | 1.4 km || 
|-id=111 bgcolor=#E9E9E9
| 160111 ||  || — || September 27, 2000 || Socorro || LINEAR || — || align=right | 3.0 km || 
|-id=112 bgcolor=#fefefe
| 160112 ||  || — || September 22, 2000 || Haleakala || NEAT || — || align=right | 1.9 km || 
|-id=113 bgcolor=#fefefe
| 160113 ||  || — || September 26, 2000 || Socorro || LINEAR || — || align=right | 1.4 km || 
|-id=114 bgcolor=#fefefe
| 160114 ||  || — || September 26, 2000 || Socorro || LINEAR || — || align=right | 1.8 km || 
|-id=115 bgcolor=#fefefe
| 160115 ||  || — || September 25, 2000 || Socorro || LINEAR || — || align=right | 1.4 km || 
|-id=116 bgcolor=#fefefe
| 160116 ||  || — || September 24, 2000 || Socorro || LINEAR || — || align=right | 1.6 km || 
|-id=117 bgcolor=#fefefe
| 160117 ||  || — || September 24, 2000 || Socorro || LINEAR || — || align=right | 1.7 km || 
|-id=118 bgcolor=#fefefe
| 160118 ||  || — || September 27, 2000 || Socorro || LINEAR || — || align=right | 1.3 km || 
|-id=119 bgcolor=#fefefe
| 160119 ||  || — || October 4, 2000 || Kitt Peak || Spacewatch || — || align=right | 1.2 km || 
|-id=120 bgcolor=#fefefe
| 160120 ||  || — || October 24, 2000 || Socorro || LINEAR || EUT || align=right | 1.5 km || 
|-id=121 bgcolor=#E9E9E9
| 160121 ||  || — || October 24, 2000 || Socorro || LINEAR || — || align=right | 2.1 km || 
|-id=122 bgcolor=#fefefe
| 160122 ||  || — || October 25, 2000 || Socorro || LINEAR || NYS || align=right | 3.1 km || 
|-id=123 bgcolor=#fefefe
| 160123 ||  || — || October 31, 2000 || Socorro || LINEAR || — || align=right | 1.3 km || 
|-id=124 bgcolor=#fefefe
| 160124 ||  || — || October 25, 2000 || Socorro || LINEAR || V || align=right | 1.5 km || 
|-id=125 bgcolor=#fefefe
| 160125 ||  || — || November 1, 2000 || Socorro || LINEAR || NYS || align=right | 1.2 km || 
|-id=126 bgcolor=#fefefe
| 160126 ||  || — || November 21, 2000 || Socorro || LINEAR || — || align=right | 1.8 km || 
|-id=127 bgcolor=#fefefe
| 160127 ||  || — || November 21, 2000 || Socorro || LINEAR || NYS || align=right | 1.5 km || 
|-id=128 bgcolor=#fefefe
| 160128 ||  || — || December 4, 2000 || Socorro || LINEAR || — || align=right | 2.0 km || 
|-id=129 bgcolor=#fefefe
| 160129 ||  || — || December 4, 2000 || Socorro || LINEAR || — || align=right | 5.4 km || 
|-id=130 bgcolor=#fefefe
| 160130 ||  || — || December 4, 2000 || Socorro || LINEAR || — || align=right | 5.6 km || 
|-id=131 bgcolor=#fefefe
| 160131 ||  || — || December 15, 2000 || Socorro || LINEAR || PHO || align=right | 2.7 km || 
|-id=132 bgcolor=#d6d6d6
| 160132 ||  || — || December 20, 2000 || Socorro || LINEAR || LIX || align=right | 7.0 km || 
|-id=133 bgcolor=#fefefe
| 160133 ||  || — || December 30, 2000 || Socorro || LINEAR || — || align=right | 2.3 km || 
|-id=134 bgcolor=#fefefe
| 160134 ||  || — || December 29, 2000 || Anderson Mesa || LONEOS || NYS || align=right | 1.1 km || 
|-id=135 bgcolor=#C2FFFF
| 160135 ||  || — || December 30, 2000 || Socorro || LINEAR || L4 || align=right | 22 km || 
|-id=136 bgcolor=#fefefe
| 160136 ||  || — || January 20, 2001 || Socorro || LINEAR || H || align=right | 1.0 km || 
|-id=137 bgcolor=#FA8072
| 160137 ||  || — || January 20, 2001 || Socorro || LINEAR || PHO || align=right | 2.8 km || 
|-id=138 bgcolor=#fefefe
| 160138 ||  || — || February 13, 2001 || Socorro || LINEAR || H || align=right | 1.3 km || 
|-id=139 bgcolor=#E9E9E9
| 160139 ||  || — || February 13, 2001 || Kitt Peak || Spacewatch || — || align=right | 4.5 km || 
|-id=140 bgcolor=#C2FFFF
| 160140 ||  || — || February 16, 2001 || Socorro || LINEAR || L4 || align=right | 19 km || 
|-id=141 bgcolor=#fefefe
| 160141 ||  || — || February 16, 2001 || Socorro || LINEAR || H || align=right data-sort-value="0.86" | 860 m || 
|-id=142 bgcolor=#E9E9E9
| 160142 ||  || — || February 16, 2001 || Socorro || LINEAR || — || align=right | 5.0 km || 
|-id=143 bgcolor=#fefefe
| 160143 ||  || — || March 14, 2001 || Socorro || LINEAR || H || align=right | 1.1 km || 
|-id=144 bgcolor=#d6d6d6
| 160144 ||  || — || March 18, 2001 || Socorro || LINEAR || — || align=right | 5.3 km || 
|-id=145 bgcolor=#fefefe
| 160145 ||  || — || March 26, 2001 || Kitt Peak || Spacewatch || NYS || align=right data-sort-value="0.92" | 920 m || 
|-id=146 bgcolor=#d6d6d6
| 160146 ||  || — || April 26, 2001 || Desert Beaver || W. K. Y. Yeung || EUP || align=right | 8.1 km || 
|-id=147 bgcolor=#C2E0FF
| 160147 ||  || — || May 22, 2001 || Cerro Tololo || M. W. Buie || cubewano (cold)critical || align=right | 212 km || 
|-id=148 bgcolor=#C2E0FF
| 160148 ||  || — || May 24, 2001 || Cerro Tololo || M. W. Buie || res2:7critical || align=right | 122 km || 
|-id=149 bgcolor=#fefefe
| 160149 ||  || — || June 15, 2001 || Socorro || LINEAR || V || align=right data-sort-value="0.98" | 980 m || 
|-id=150 bgcolor=#d6d6d6
| 160150 ||  || — || June 16, 2001 || Anderson Mesa || LONEOS || EOS || align=right | 5.2 km || 
|-id=151 bgcolor=#fefefe
| 160151 ||  || — || July 13, 2001 || Palomar || NEAT || V || align=right data-sort-value="0.99" | 990 m || 
|-id=152 bgcolor=#d6d6d6
| 160152 ||  || — || July 22, 2001 || Palomar || NEAT || — || align=right | 8.5 km || 
|-id=153 bgcolor=#d6d6d6
| 160153 ||  || — || July 21, 2001 || Haleakala || NEAT || HYG || align=right | 5.6 km || 
|-id=154 bgcolor=#fefefe
| 160154 ||  || — || August 19, 2001 || Socorro || LINEAR || MAS || align=right | 1.0 km || 
|-id=155 bgcolor=#fefefe
| 160155 ||  || — || August 22, 2001 || Socorro || LINEAR || — || align=right | 1.6 km || 
|-id=156 bgcolor=#d6d6d6
| 160156 ||  || — || August 18, 2001 || Anderson Mesa || LONEOS || MEL || align=right | 8.2 km || 
|-id=157 bgcolor=#d6d6d6
| 160157 ||  || — || September 7, 2001 || Socorro || LINEAR || — || align=right | 3.9 km || 
|-id=158 bgcolor=#fefefe
| 160158 ||  || — || September 12, 2001 || Socorro || LINEAR || — || align=right | 2.0 km || 
|-id=159 bgcolor=#fefefe
| 160159 ||  || — || September 20, 2001 || Socorro || LINEAR || — || align=right | 1.7 km || 
|-id=160 bgcolor=#fefefe
| 160160 ||  || — || September 21, 2001 || Socorro || LINEAR || — || align=right | 1.2 km || 
|-id=161 bgcolor=#E9E9E9
| 160161 ||  || — || September 22, 2001 || Socorro || LINEAR || — || align=right | 3.7 km || 
|-id=162 bgcolor=#fefefe
| 160162 ||  || — || September 23, 2001 || Haleakala || NEAT || V || align=right data-sort-value="0.87" | 870 m || 
|-id=163 bgcolor=#fefefe
| 160163 ||  || — || October 12, 2001 || Anderson Mesa || LONEOS || — || align=right data-sort-value="0.99" | 990 m || 
|-id=164 bgcolor=#C2FFFF
| 160164 ||  || — || October 14, 2001 || Apache Point || SDSS || L5 || align=right | 13 km || 
|-id=165 bgcolor=#E9E9E9
| 160165 || 2001 UR || — || October 18, 2001 || Emerald Lane || L. Ball || — || align=right | 1.2 km || 
|-id=166 bgcolor=#E9E9E9
| 160166 ||  || — || October 21, 2001 || Kitt Peak || Spacewatch || — || align=right | 1.5 km || 
|-id=167 bgcolor=#E9E9E9
| 160167 ||  || — || October 20, 2001 || Socorro || LINEAR || — || align=right | 2.1 km || 
|-id=168 bgcolor=#E9E9E9
| 160168 ||  || — || October 23, 2001 || Socorro || LINEAR || — || align=right | 1.7 km || 
|-id=169 bgcolor=#E9E9E9
| 160169 ||  || — || October 23, 2001 || Socorro || LINEAR || — || align=right | 1.8 km || 
|-id=170 bgcolor=#E9E9E9
| 160170 ||  || — || November 9, 2001 || Socorro || LINEAR || — || align=right | 3.2 km || 
|-id=171 bgcolor=#fefefe
| 160171 ||  || — || November 9, 2001 || Socorro || LINEAR || — || align=right | 1.7 km || 
|-id=172 bgcolor=#fefefe
| 160172 ||  || — || November 15, 2001 || Socorro || LINEAR || — || align=right | 2.0 km || 
|-id=173 bgcolor=#E9E9E9
| 160173 ||  || — || November 12, 2001 || Socorro || LINEAR || — || align=right | 2.4 km || 
|-id=174 bgcolor=#E9E9E9
| 160174 ||  || — || November 17, 2001 || Socorro || LINEAR || — || align=right | 2.0 km || 
|-id=175 bgcolor=#E9E9E9
| 160175 ||  || — || November 17, 2001 || Socorro || LINEAR || — || align=right | 3.9 km || 
|-id=176 bgcolor=#E9E9E9
| 160176 ||  || — || November 17, 2001 || Socorro || LINEAR || — || align=right | 1.7 km || 
|-id=177 bgcolor=#fefefe
| 160177 ||  || — || November 19, 2001 || Socorro || LINEAR || — || align=right | 1.1 km || 
|-id=178 bgcolor=#fefefe
| 160178 ||  || — || November 19, 2001 || Socorro || LINEAR || — || align=right | 1.4 km || 
|-id=179 bgcolor=#E9E9E9
| 160179 ||  || — || November 20, 2001 || Socorro || LINEAR || — || align=right | 2.2 km || 
|-id=180 bgcolor=#E9E9E9
| 160180 ||  || — || November 20, 2001 || Socorro || LINEAR || — || align=right | 2.3 km || 
|-id=181 bgcolor=#E9E9E9
| 160181 ||  || — || November 19, 2001 || Socorro || LINEAR || — || align=right | 2.6 km || 
|-id=182 bgcolor=#E9E9E9
| 160182 ||  || — || November 19, 2001 || Anderson Mesa || LONEOS || — || align=right | 2.2 km || 
|-id=183 bgcolor=#E9E9E9
| 160183 ||  || — || December 11, 2001 || Socorro || LINEAR || PAD || align=right | 2.8 km || 
|-id=184 bgcolor=#E9E9E9
| 160184 ||  || — || December 13, 2001 || Socorro || LINEAR || — || align=right | 3.9 km || 
|-id=185 bgcolor=#fefefe
| 160185 ||  || — || December 13, 2001 || Socorro || LINEAR || V || align=right | 1.4 km || 
|-id=186 bgcolor=#E9E9E9
| 160186 ||  || — || December 14, 2001 || Socorro || LINEAR || — || align=right | 1.7 km || 
|-id=187 bgcolor=#E9E9E9
| 160187 ||  || — || December 14, 2001 || Socorro || LINEAR || HOF || align=right | 3.7 km || 
|-id=188 bgcolor=#fefefe
| 160188 ||  || — || December 14, 2001 || Socorro || LINEAR || NYS || align=right | 1.6 km || 
|-id=189 bgcolor=#fefefe
| 160189 ||  || — || December 14, 2001 || Socorro || LINEAR || — || align=right | 1.5 km || 
|-id=190 bgcolor=#E9E9E9
| 160190 ||  || — || December 11, 2001 || Socorro || LINEAR || — || align=right | 2.2 km || 
|-id=191 bgcolor=#E9E9E9
| 160191 ||  || — || December 11, 2001 || Socorro || LINEAR || — || align=right | 3.5 km || 
|-id=192 bgcolor=#fefefe
| 160192 ||  || — || December 18, 2001 || Socorro || LINEAR || — || align=right | 1.5 km || 
|-id=193 bgcolor=#E9E9E9
| 160193 ||  || — || December 18, 2001 || Socorro || LINEAR || — || align=right | 3.2 km || 
|-id=194 bgcolor=#d6d6d6
| 160194 ||  || — || December 18, 2001 || Socorro || LINEAR || — || align=right | 4.0 km || 
|-id=195 bgcolor=#E9E9E9
| 160195 ||  || — || December 18, 2001 || Socorro || LINEAR || — || align=right | 3.5 km || 
|-id=196 bgcolor=#E9E9E9
| 160196 ||  || — || December 18, 2001 || Socorro || LINEAR || — || align=right | 2.2 km || 
|-id=197 bgcolor=#E9E9E9
| 160197 ||  || — || December 24, 2001 || Haleakala || NEAT || — || align=right | 3.5 km || 
|-id=198 bgcolor=#fefefe
| 160198 ||  || — || December 19, 2001 || Palomar || NEAT || — || align=right | 1.4 km || 
|-id=199 bgcolor=#d6d6d6
| 160199 ||  || — || January 9, 2002 || Socorro || LINEAR || — || align=right | 3.6 km || 
|-id=200 bgcolor=#d6d6d6
| 160200 ||  || — || January 9, 2002 || Socorro || LINEAR || — || align=right | 3.7 km || 
|}

160201–160300 

|-bgcolor=#E9E9E9
| 160201 ||  || — || January 14, 2002 || Socorro || LINEAR || — || align=right | 3.4 km || 
|-id=202 bgcolor=#d6d6d6
| 160202 ||  || — || January 22, 2002 || Palomar || NEAT || — || align=right | 5.6 km || 
|-id=203 bgcolor=#E9E9E9
| 160203 ||  || — || January 21, 2002 || Palomar || NEAT || — || align=right | 2.1 km || 
|-id=204 bgcolor=#fefefe
| 160204 ||  || — || February 6, 2002 || Socorro || LINEAR || — || align=right | 1.4 km || 
|-id=205 bgcolor=#E9E9E9
| 160205 ||  || — || February 6, 2002 || Socorro || LINEAR || — || align=right | 2.7 km || 
|-id=206 bgcolor=#fefefe
| 160206 ||  || — || February 7, 2002 || Socorro || LINEAR || FLO || align=right | 1.7 km || 
|-id=207 bgcolor=#d6d6d6
| 160207 ||  || — || February 10, 2002 || Desert Eagle || W. K. Y. Yeung || EOS || align=right | 2.4 km || 
|-id=208 bgcolor=#d6d6d6
| 160208 ||  || — || February 7, 2002 || Socorro || LINEAR || EOS || align=right | 2.2 km || 
|-id=209 bgcolor=#d6d6d6
| 160209 ||  || — || February 7, 2002 || Socorro || LINEAR || — || align=right | 4.3 km || 
|-id=210 bgcolor=#d6d6d6
| 160210 ||  || — || February 7, 2002 || Socorro || LINEAR || THM || align=right | 4.6 km || 
|-id=211 bgcolor=#d6d6d6
| 160211 ||  || — || February 10, 2002 || Socorro || LINEAR || — || align=right | 3.9 km || 
|-id=212 bgcolor=#d6d6d6
| 160212 ||  || — || February 10, 2002 || Socorro || LINEAR || TEL || align=right | 1.9 km || 
|-id=213 bgcolor=#d6d6d6
| 160213 ||  || — || February 4, 2002 || Palomar || NEAT || TEL || align=right | 2.4 km || 
|-id=214 bgcolor=#d6d6d6
| 160214 ||  || — || February 5, 2002 || Anderson Mesa || LONEOS || EOS || align=right | 4.1 km || 
|-id=215 bgcolor=#fefefe
| 160215 Haines-Stiles ||  ||  || February 8, 2002 || Kitt Peak || M. W. Buie || NYS || align=right | 1.6 km || 
|-id=216 bgcolor=#E9E9E9
| 160216 ||  || — || March 9, 2002 || Socorro || LINEAR || RAF || align=right | 1.2 km || 
|-id=217 bgcolor=#d6d6d6
| 160217 ||  || — || March 9, 2002 || Socorro || LINEAR || — || align=right | 3.9 km || 
|-id=218 bgcolor=#fefefe
| 160218 ||  || — || March 13, 2002 || Socorro || LINEAR || V || align=right | 1.3 km || 
|-id=219 bgcolor=#d6d6d6
| 160219 ||  || — || March 10, 2002 || Kitt Peak || Spacewatch || THM || align=right | 3.2 km || 
|-id=220 bgcolor=#E9E9E9
| 160220 ||  || — || March 18, 2002 || Haleakala || NEAT || — || align=right | 3.0 km || 
|-id=221 bgcolor=#fefefe
| 160221 ||  || — || March 20, 2002 || Socorro || LINEAR || — || align=right | 2.0 km || 
|-id=222 bgcolor=#E9E9E9
| 160222 ||  || — || April 15, 2002 || Palomar || NEAT || — || align=right | 4.5 km || 
|-id=223 bgcolor=#d6d6d6
| 160223 ||  || — || April 2, 2002 || Palomar || NEAT || EUP || align=right | 5.3 km || 
|-id=224 bgcolor=#E9E9E9
| 160224 ||  || — || April 8, 2002 || Palomar || NEAT || — || align=right | 5.1 km || 
|-id=225 bgcolor=#E9E9E9
| 160225 ||  || — || April 8, 2002 || Socorro || LINEAR || — || align=right | 4.1 km || 
|-id=226 bgcolor=#E9E9E9
| 160226 ||  || — || April 9, 2002 || Socorro || LINEAR || — || align=right | 1.7 km || 
|-id=227 bgcolor=#d6d6d6
| 160227 ||  || — || April 11, 2002 || Palomar || NEAT || — || align=right | 3.4 km || 
|-id=228 bgcolor=#d6d6d6
| 160228 ||  || — || April 10, 2002 || Socorro || LINEAR || — || align=right | 3.6 km || 
|-id=229 bgcolor=#d6d6d6
| 160229 ||  || — || April 11, 2002 || Palomar || NEAT || — || align=right | 4.3 km || 
|-id=230 bgcolor=#E9E9E9
| 160230 ||  || — || April 8, 2002 || Kitt Peak || Spacewatch || — || align=right | 2.1 km || 
|-id=231 bgcolor=#E9E9E9
| 160231 || 2002 HA || — || April 16, 2002 || Kvistaberg || UDAS || JUN || align=right | 2.1 km || 
|-id=232 bgcolor=#E9E9E9
| 160232 ||  || — || April 19, 2002 || Kitt Peak || Spacewatch || — || align=right | 3.1 km || 
|-id=233 bgcolor=#E9E9E9
| 160233 ||  || — || May 8, 2002 || Socorro || LINEAR || — || align=right | 3.4 km || 
|-id=234 bgcolor=#d6d6d6
| 160234 ||  || — || May 8, 2002 || Socorro || LINEAR || HIL3:2 || align=right | 9.4 km || 
|-id=235 bgcolor=#E9E9E9
| 160235 ||  || — || May 8, 2002 || Haleakala || NEAT || JUN || align=right | 2.4 km || 
|-id=236 bgcolor=#E9E9E9
| 160236 ||  || — || May 9, 2002 || Socorro || LINEAR || — || align=right | 4.0 km || 
|-id=237 bgcolor=#E9E9E9
| 160237 ||  || — || May 14, 2002 || Palomar || NEAT || — || align=right | 4.5 km || 
|-id=238 bgcolor=#E9E9E9
| 160238 ||  || — || May 11, 2002 || Socorro || LINEAR || INO || align=right | 2.2 km || 
|-id=239 bgcolor=#E9E9E9
| 160239 ||  || — || May 5, 2002 || Anderson Mesa || LONEOS || — || align=right | 2.7 km || 
|-id=240 bgcolor=#E9E9E9
| 160240 ||  || — || May 5, 2002 || Palomar || NEAT || — || align=right | 3.2 km || 
|-id=241 bgcolor=#E9E9E9
| 160241 ||  || — || May 14, 2002 || Palomar || NEAT || — || align=right | 2.1 km || 
|-id=242 bgcolor=#d6d6d6
| 160242 ||  || — || June 16, 2002 || Palomar || NEAT || — || align=right | 6.6 km || 
|-id=243 bgcolor=#d6d6d6
| 160243 ||  || — || July 13, 2002 || Socorro || LINEAR || ALA || align=right | 10 km || 
|-id=244 bgcolor=#d6d6d6
| 160244 ||  || — || July 9, 2002 || Socorro || LINEAR || — || align=right | 5.1 km || 
|-id=245 bgcolor=#d6d6d6
| 160245 ||  || — || July 14, 2002 || Palomar || S. F. Hönig || — || align=right | 4.4 km || 
|-id=246 bgcolor=#d6d6d6
| 160246 ||  || — || July 17, 2002 || Socorro || LINEAR || — || align=right | 6.8 km || 
|-id=247 bgcolor=#d6d6d6
| 160247 ||  || — || July 17, 2002 || Socorro || LINEAR || — || align=right | 6.7 km || 
|-id=248 bgcolor=#d6d6d6
| 160248 ||  || — || July 20, 2002 || Palomar || NEAT || EMA || align=right | 6.8 km || 
|-id=249 bgcolor=#d6d6d6
| 160249 ||  || — || August 6, 2002 || Palomar || NEAT || EOS || align=right | 3.5 km || 
|-id=250 bgcolor=#d6d6d6
| 160250 ||  || — || August 6, 2002 || Palomar || NEAT || EOS || align=right | 4.4 km || 
|-id=251 bgcolor=#d6d6d6
| 160251 ||  || — || August 4, 2002 || Socorro || LINEAR || — || align=right | 6.9 km || 
|-id=252 bgcolor=#d6d6d6
| 160252 ||  || — || August 5, 2002 || Socorro || LINEAR || — || align=right | 5.9 km || 
|-id=253 bgcolor=#d6d6d6
| 160253 ||  || — || August 10, 2002 || Socorro || LINEAR || EOS || align=right | 3.1 km || 
|-id=254 bgcolor=#d6d6d6
| 160254 ||  || — || August 11, 2002 || Socorro || LINEAR || — || align=right | 5.8 km || 
|-id=255 bgcolor=#d6d6d6
| 160255 ||  || — || August 14, 2002 || Palomar || NEAT || ALA || align=right | 6.0 km || 
|-id=256 bgcolor=#C2E0FF
| 160256 ||  || — || August 10, 2002 || Cerro Tololo || M. W. Buie || cubewano (cold)mooncritical || align=right | 205 km || 
|-id=257 bgcolor=#d6d6d6
| 160257 ||  || — || August 28, 2002 || Socorro || LINEAR || — || align=right | 9.3 km || 
|-id=258 bgcolor=#fefefe
| 160258 ||  || — || August 28, 2002 || Socorro || LINEAR || H || align=right | 1.6 km || 
|-id=259 bgcolor=#d6d6d6
| 160259 Mareike ||  ||  || August 29, 2002 || Palomar || S. F. Hönig || 7:4 || align=right | 5.0 km || 
|-id=260 bgcolor=#d6d6d6
| 160260 ||  || — || August 26, 2002 || Palomar || NEAT || — || align=right | 4.7 km || 
|-id=261 bgcolor=#d6d6d6
| 160261 ||  || — || September 1, 2002 || Haleakala || NEAT || EOS || align=right | 4.4 km || 
|-id=262 bgcolor=#d6d6d6
| 160262 ||  || — || September 3, 2002 || Haleakala || NEAT || — || align=right | 3.9 km || 
|-id=263 bgcolor=#d6d6d6
| 160263 ||  || — || September 4, 2002 || Anderson Mesa || LONEOS || LUT || align=right | 9.5 km || 
|-id=264 bgcolor=#d6d6d6
| 160264 ||  || — || September 5, 2002 || Socorro || LINEAR || — || align=right | 5.7 km || 
|-id=265 bgcolor=#d6d6d6
| 160265 ||  || — || September 5, 2002 || Socorro || LINEAR || — || align=right | 6.5 km || 
|-id=266 bgcolor=#d6d6d6
| 160266 ||  || — || September 27, 2002 || Palomar || NEAT || — || align=right | 9.9 km || 
|-id=267 bgcolor=#d6d6d6
| 160267 ||  || — || September 27, 2002 || Socorro || LINEAR || — || align=right | 5.6 km || 
|-id=268 bgcolor=#d6d6d6
| 160268 ||  || — || September 26, 2002 || Palomar || NEAT || THM || align=right | 4.0 km || 
|-id=269 bgcolor=#d6d6d6
| 160269 ||  || — || September 17, 2002 || Palomar || NEAT || — || align=right | 5.4 km || 
|-id=270 bgcolor=#fefefe
| 160270 ||  || — || October 4, 2002 || Socorro || LINEAR || H || align=right data-sort-value="0.99" | 990 m || 
|-id=271 bgcolor=#fefefe
| 160271 ||  || — || October 5, 2002 || Socorro || LINEAR || H || align=right | 1.4 km || 
|-id=272 bgcolor=#fefefe
| 160272 ||  || — || October 4, 2002 || Socorro || LINEAR || H || align=right | 1.2 km || 
|-id=273 bgcolor=#d6d6d6
| 160273 ||  || — || October 2, 2002 || Haleakala || NEAT || — || align=right | 8.0 km || 
|-id=274 bgcolor=#d6d6d6
| 160274 ||  || — || October 3, 2002 || Palomar || NEAT || LIX || align=right | 6.2 km || 
|-id=275 bgcolor=#d6d6d6
| 160275 ||  || — || October 4, 2002 || Socorro || LINEAR || EOS || align=right | 3.7 km || 
|-id=276 bgcolor=#d6d6d6
| 160276 ||  || — || October 6, 2002 || Socorro || LINEAR || — || align=right | 7.8 km || 
|-id=277 bgcolor=#d6d6d6
| 160277 ||  || — || October 7, 2002 || Socorro || LINEAR || — || align=right | 6.4 km || 
|-id=278 bgcolor=#d6d6d6
| 160278 ||  || — || October 6, 2002 || Socorro || LINEAR || TIR || align=right | 11 km || 
|-id=279 bgcolor=#d6d6d6
| 160279 ||  || — || October 6, 2002 || Socorro || LINEAR || — || align=right | 7.9 km || 
|-id=280 bgcolor=#d6d6d6
| 160280 ||  || — || October 28, 2002 || Palomar || NEAT || HYG || align=right | 5.2 km || 
|-id=281 bgcolor=#fefefe
| 160281 || 2002 WO || — || November 21, 2002 || Palomar || NEAT || H || align=right | 1.1 km || 
|-id=282 bgcolor=#fefefe
| 160282 ||  || — || December 31, 2002 || Socorro || LINEAR || — || align=right | 1.4 km || 
|-id=283 bgcolor=#fefefe
| 160283 ||  || — || January 7, 2003 || Socorro || LINEAR || ERI || align=right | 2.0 km || 
|-id=284 bgcolor=#fefefe
| 160284 ||  || — || January 8, 2003 || Socorro || LINEAR || — || align=right | 1.2 km || 
|-id=285 bgcolor=#E9E9E9
| 160285 ||  || — || January 12, 2003 || Socorro || LINEAR || — || align=right | 1.6 km || 
|-id=286 bgcolor=#E9E9E9
| 160286 ||  || — || January 27, 2003 || Kitt Peak || Spacewatch || — || align=right | 1.4 km || 
|-id=287 bgcolor=#fefefe
| 160287 ||  || — || January 27, 2003 || Socorro || LINEAR || NYS || align=right data-sort-value="0.76" | 760 m || 
|-id=288 bgcolor=#fefefe
| 160288 ||  || — || January 30, 2003 || Anderson Mesa || LONEOS || NYS || align=right | 2.6 km || 
|-id=289 bgcolor=#E9E9E9
| 160289 ||  || — || January 30, 2003 || Anderson Mesa || LONEOS || — || align=right | 2.2 km || 
|-id=290 bgcolor=#E9E9E9
| 160290 ||  || — || January 31, 2003 || Anderson Mesa || LONEOS || — || align=right | 1.4 km || 
|-id=291 bgcolor=#E9E9E9
| 160291 ||  || — || February 1, 2003 || Socorro || LINEAR || — || align=right | 1.4 km || 
|-id=292 bgcolor=#fefefe
| 160292 ||  || — || February 20, 2003 || Kvistaberg || UDAS || MAS || align=right data-sort-value="0.95" | 950 m || 
|-id=293 bgcolor=#E9E9E9
| 160293 ||  || — || February 21, 2003 || Palomar || NEAT || — || align=right | 2.8 km || 
|-id=294 bgcolor=#fefefe
| 160294 ||  || — || March 7, 2003 || Anderson Mesa || LONEOS || FLO || align=right | 2.1 km || 
|-id=295 bgcolor=#fefefe
| 160295 ||  || — || March 10, 2003 || Kitt Peak || Spacewatch || FLO || align=right | 2.0 km || 
|-id=296 bgcolor=#fefefe
| 160296 ||  || — || March 24, 2003 || Kitt Peak || Spacewatch || V || align=right | 1.2 km || 
|-id=297 bgcolor=#E9E9E9
| 160297 ||  || — || March 22, 2003 || Haleakala || NEAT || — || align=right | 2.0 km || 
|-id=298 bgcolor=#E9E9E9
| 160298 ||  || — || March 26, 2003 || Palomar || NEAT || — || align=right | 2.3 km || 
|-id=299 bgcolor=#fefefe
| 160299 ||  || — || March 29, 2003 || Anderson Mesa || LONEOS || PHO || align=right | 2.5 km || 
|-id=300 bgcolor=#E9E9E9
| 160300 ||  || — || March 29, 2003 || Anderson Mesa || LONEOS || — || align=right | 1.4 km || 
|}

160301–160400 

|-bgcolor=#E9E9E9
| 160301 ||  || — || March 31, 2003 || Anderson Mesa || LONEOS || — || align=right | 2.2 km || 
|-id=302 bgcolor=#E9E9E9
| 160302 ||  || — || March 31, 2003 || Socorro || LINEAR || — || align=right | 2.9 km || 
|-id=303 bgcolor=#fefefe
| 160303 ||  || — || March 31, 2003 || Socorro || LINEAR || — || align=right | 1.4 km || 
|-id=304 bgcolor=#fefefe
| 160304 ||  || — || April 2, 2003 || Haleakala || NEAT || — || align=right | 1.8 km || 
|-id=305 bgcolor=#d6d6d6
| 160305 ||  || — || April 1, 2003 || Socorro || LINEAR || THM || align=right | 3.5 km || 
|-id=306 bgcolor=#fefefe
| 160306 ||  || — || April 1, 2003 || Socorro || LINEAR || — || align=right | 1.4 km || 
|-id=307 bgcolor=#fefefe
| 160307 ||  || — || April 1, 2003 || Socorro || LINEAR || NYS || align=right | 1.3 km || 
|-id=308 bgcolor=#d6d6d6
| 160308 ||  || — || April 1, 2003 || Socorro || LINEAR || — || align=right | 4.7 km || 
|-id=309 bgcolor=#E9E9E9
| 160309 ||  || — || April 4, 2003 || Socorro || LINEAR || — || align=right | 3.3 km || 
|-id=310 bgcolor=#fefefe
| 160310 ||  || — || April 8, 2003 || Socorro || LINEAR || NYS || align=right data-sort-value="0.94" | 940 m || 
|-id=311 bgcolor=#E9E9E9
| 160311 ||  || — || April 6, 2003 || Anderson Mesa || LONEOS || — || align=right | 4.1 km || 
|-id=312 bgcolor=#E9E9E9
| 160312 ||  || — || April 8, 2003 || Socorro || LINEAR || — || align=right | 1.9 km || 
|-id=313 bgcolor=#fefefe
| 160313 ||  || — || April 28, 2003 || Anderson Mesa || LONEOS || — || align=right | 2.7 km || 
|-id=314 bgcolor=#fefefe
| 160314 ||  || — || April 28, 2003 || Socorro || LINEAR || NYS || align=right | 1.2 km || 
|-id=315 bgcolor=#E9E9E9
| 160315 ||  || — || April 30, 2003 || Haleakala || NEAT || — || align=right | 6.0 km || 
|-id=316 bgcolor=#fefefe
| 160316 ||  || — || April 28, 2003 || Haleakala || NEAT || V || align=right | 1.3 km || 
|-id=317 bgcolor=#E9E9E9
| 160317 ||  || — || May 1, 2003 || Socorro || LINEAR || JUN || align=right | 1.3 km || 
|-id=318 bgcolor=#d6d6d6
| 160318 ||  || — || May 2, 2003 || Socorro || LINEAR || — || align=right | 5.9 km || 
|-id=319 bgcolor=#fefefe
| 160319 ||  || — || May 2, 2003 || Kitt Peak || Spacewatch || ERI || align=right | 3.5 km || 
|-id=320 bgcolor=#E9E9E9
| 160320 ||  || — || May 27, 2003 || Anderson Mesa || LONEOS || CLO || align=right | 2.9 km || 
|-id=321 bgcolor=#d6d6d6
| 160321 ||  || — || May 26, 2003 || Haleakala || NEAT || — || align=right | 4.7 km || 
|-id=322 bgcolor=#fefefe
| 160322 ||  || — || June 5, 2003 || Reedy Creek || J. Broughton || — || align=right | 1.7 km || 
|-id=323 bgcolor=#E9E9E9
| 160323 ||  || — || June 28, 2003 || Socorro || LINEAR || — || align=right | 1.6 km || 
|-id=324 bgcolor=#E9E9E9
| 160324 ||  || — || June 29, 2003 || Socorro || LINEAR || — || align=right | 2.5 km || 
|-id=325 bgcolor=#d6d6d6
| 160325 ||  || — || July 2, 2003 || Siding Spring || R. H. McNaught || — || align=right | 8.6 km || 
|-id=326 bgcolor=#fefefe
| 160326 ||  || — || July 7, 2003 || Reedy Creek || J. Broughton || — || align=right | 4.3 km || 
|-id=327 bgcolor=#fefefe
| 160327 ||  || — || July 3, 2003 || Kitt Peak || Spacewatch || V || align=right | 1.1 km || 
|-id=328 bgcolor=#E9E9E9
| 160328 ||  || — || July 21, 2003 || Campo Imperatore || CINEOS || — || align=right | 1.8 km || 
|-id=329 bgcolor=#E9E9E9
| 160329 ||  || — || July 30, 2003 || Socorro || LINEAR || — || align=right | 1.4 km || 
|-id=330 bgcolor=#E9E9E9
| 160330 ||  || — || August 22, 2003 || Socorro || LINEAR || — || align=right | 2.9 km || 
|-id=331 bgcolor=#E9E9E9
| 160331 ||  || — || August 23, 2003 || Socorro || LINEAR || — || align=right | 2.2 km || 
|-id=332 bgcolor=#E9E9E9
| 160332 ||  || — || August 23, 2003 || Socorro || LINEAR || — || align=right | 5.3 km || 
|-id=333 bgcolor=#E9E9E9
| 160333 ||  || — || August 24, 2003 || Socorro || LINEAR || — || align=right | 2.6 km || 
|-id=334 bgcolor=#E9E9E9
| 160334 ||  || — || August 31, 2003 || Socorro || LINEAR || — || align=right | 3.0 km || 
|-id=335 bgcolor=#E9E9E9
| 160335 ||  || — || September 1, 2003 || Socorro || LINEAR || — || align=right | 3.2 km || 
|-id=336 bgcolor=#E9E9E9
| 160336 ||  || — || September 3, 2003 || Haleakala || NEAT || — || align=right | 2.9 km || 
|-id=337 bgcolor=#E9E9E9
| 160337 ||  || — || September 15, 2003 || Palomar || NEAT || MIT || align=right | 3.9 km || 
|-id=338 bgcolor=#E9E9E9
| 160338 ||  || — || September 19, 2003 || Palomar || NEAT || — || align=right | 4.2 km || 
|-id=339 bgcolor=#E9E9E9
| 160339 ||  || — || September 19, 2003 || Campo Imperatore || CINEOS || — || align=right | 4.0 km || 
|-id=340 bgcolor=#E9E9E9
| 160340 ||  || — || September 20, 2003 || Palomar || NEAT || — || align=right | 4.7 km || 
|-id=341 bgcolor=#E9E9E9
| 160341 ||  || — || September 20, 2003 || Socorro || LINEAR || AGN || align=right | 2.4 km || 
|-id=342 bgcolor=#E9E9E9
| 160342 ||  || — || September 20, 2003 || Socorro || LINEAR || NEM || align=right | 4.1 km || 
|-id=343 bgcolor=#E9E9E9
| 160343 ||  || — || September 18, 2003 || Socorro || LINEAR || INO || align=right | 2.2 km || 
|-id=344 bgcolor=#E9E9E9
| 160344 ||  || — || September 20, 2003 || Campo Imperatore || CINEOS || WIT || align=right | 2.3 km || 
|-id=345 bgcolor=#E9E9E9
| 160345 ||  || — || September 18, 2003 || Kitt Peak || Spacewatch || — || align=right | 2.7 km || 
|-id=346 bgcolor=#E9E9E9
| 160346 ||  || — || September 29, 2003 || Anderson Mesa || LONEOS || GEF || align=right | 2.2 km || 
|-id=347 bgcolor=#E9E9E9
| 160347 ||  || — || October 15, 2003 || Anderson Mesa || LONEOS || AGN || align=right | 2.5 km || 
|-id=348 bgcolor=#E9E9E9
| 160348 ||  || — || October 15, 2003 || Anderson Mesa || LONEOS || — || align=right | 3.0 km || 
|-id=349 bgcolor=#E9E9E9
| 160349 ||  || — || October 22, 2003 || Goodricke-Pigott || Goodricke-Pigott Obs. || WIT || align=right | 1.9 km || 
|-id=350 bgcolor=#E9E9E9
| 160350 ||  || — || October 16, 2003 || Haleakala || NEAT || GEF || align=right | 2.5 km || 
|-id=351 bgcolor=#d6d6d6
| 160351 ||  || — || October 18, 2003 || Palomar || NEAT || — || align=right | 6.9 km || 
|-id=352 bgcolor=#d6d6d6
| 160352 ||  || — || October 21, 2003 || Socorro || LINEAR || EOS || align=right | 3.3 km || 
|-id=353 bgcolor=#E9E9E9
| 160353 ||  || — || October 21, 2003 || Socorro || LINEAR || — || align=right | 4.8 km || 
|-id=354 bgcolor=#E9E9E9
| 160354 ||  || — || October 21, 2003 || Kitt Peak || Spacewatch || AGN || align=right | 2.5 km || 
|-id=355 bgcolor=#d6d6d6
| 160355 ||  || — || October 22, 2003 || Socorro || LINEAR || Tj (2.97) || align=right | 7.9 km || 
|-id=356 bgcolor=#E9E9E9
| 160356 ||  || — || October 25, 2003 || Socorro || LINEAR || — || align=right | 2.0 km || 
|-id=357 bgcolor=#E9E9E9
| 160357 ||  || — || November 20, 2003 || Socorro || LINEAR || — || align=right | 3.6 km || 
|-id=358 bgcolor=#d6d6d6
| 160358 ||  || — || November 29, 2003 || Socorro || LINEAR || ALA || align=right | 5.9 km || 
|-id=359 bgcolor=#d6d6d6
| 160359 ||  || — || December 3, 2003 || Socorro || LINEAR || ALA || align=right | 7.8 km || 
|-id=360 bgcolor=#E9E9E9
| 160360 ||  || — || December 14, 2003 || Palomar || NEAT || — || align=right | 7.9 km || 
|-id=361 bgcolor=#FA8072
| 160361 ||  || — || December 20, 2003 || Socorro || LINEAR || — || align=right | 2.0 km || 
|-id=362 bgcolor=#d6d6d6
| 160362 ||  || — || December 20, 2003 || Socorro || LINEAR || EUP || align=right | 7.2 km || 
|-id=363 bgcolor=#E9E9E9
| 160363 ||  || — || December 17, 2003 || Socorro || LINEAR || — || align=right | 6.9 km || 
|-id=364 bgcolor=#d6d6d6
| 160364 ||  || — || January 26, 2004 || Anderson Mesa || LONEOS || HYG || align=right | 5.3 km || 
|-id=365 bgcolor=#fefefe
| 160365 ||  || — || February 23, 2004 || Socorro || LINEAR || — || align=right data-sort-value="0.82" | 820 m || 
|-id=366 bgcolor=#fefefe
| 160366 ||  || — || March 12, 2004 || Palomar || NEAT || — || align=right | 1.4 km || 
|-id=367 bgcolor=#d6d6d6
| 160367 ||  || — || March 14, 2004 || Palomar || NEAT || EUP || align=right | 12 km || 
|-id=368 bgcolor=#fefefe
| 160368 ||  || — || March 15, 2004 || Catalina || CSS || — || align=right | 1.2 km || 
|-id=369 bgcolor=#fefefe
| 160369 ||  || — || March 16, 2004 || Socorro || LINEAR || FLO || align=right data-sort-value="0.84" | 840 m || 
|-id=370 bgcolor=#fefefe
| 160370 ||  || — || March 16, 2004 || Socorro || LINEAR || NYS || align=right | 1.0 km || 
|-id=371 bgcolor=#fefefe
| 160371 ||  || — || March 18, 2004 || Kitt Peak || Spacewatch || FLO || align=right data-sort-value="0.92" | 920 m || 
|-id=372 bgcolor=#fefefe
| 160372 ||  || — || March 18, 2004 || Kitt Peak || Spacewatch || — || align=right | 1.1 km || 
|-id=373 bgcolor=#fefefe
| 160373 ||  || — || March 19, 2004 || Socorro || LINEAR || MAS || align=right | 1.2 km || 
|-id=374 bgcolor=#fefefe
| 160374 ||  || — || April 12, 2004 || Anderson Mesa || LONEOS || NYS || align=right data-sort-value="0.86" | 860 m || 
|-id=375 bgcolor=#fefefe
| 160375 ||  || — || April 17, 2004 || Socorro || LINEAR || — || align=right | 1.4 km || 
|-id=376 bgcolor=#fefefe
| 160376 ||  || — || April 20, 2004 || Socorro || LINEAR || FLO || align=right data-sort-value="0.96" | 960 m || 
|-id=377 bgcolor=#fefefe
| 160377 ||  || — || April 20, 2004 || Socorro || LINEAR || V || align=right data-sort-value="0.97" | 970 m || 
|-id=378 bgcolor=#fefefe
| 160378 ||  || — || April 21, 2004 || Socorro || LINEAR || NYS || align=right | 3.0 km || 
|-id=379 bgcolor=#E9E9E9
| 160379 ||  || — || April 23, 2004 || Socorro || LINEAR || — || align=right | 3.3 km || 
|-id=380 bgcolor=#d6d6d6
| 160380 ||  || — || April 21, 2004 || Kitt Peak || Spacewatch || — || align=right | 5.4 km || 
|-id=381 bgcolor=#fefefe
| 160381 ||  || — || May 11, 2004 || Mauna Kea || J. Pittichová, N. Moskovitz || — || align=right data-sort-value="0.92" | 920 m || 
|-id=382 bgcolor=#fefefe
| 160382 ||  || — || May 12, 2004 || Catalina || CSS || V || align=right data-sort-value="0.94" | 940 m || 
|-id=383 bgcolor=#fefefe
| 160383 ||  || — || May 13, 2004 || Palomar || NEAT || — || align=right | 1.3 km || 
|-id=384 bgcolor=#fefefe
| 160384 ||  || — || May 15, 2004 || Socorro || LINEAR || V || align=right | 1.1 km || 
|-id=385 bgcolor=#fefefe
| 160385 ||  || — || May 15, 2004 || Socorro || LINEAR || — || align=right | 1.4 km || 
|-id=386 bgcolor=#fefefe
| 160386 ||  || — || May 14, 2004 || Socorro || LINEAR || CHL || align=right | 3.6 km || 
|-id=387 bgcolor=#fefefe
| 160387 ||  || — || May 15, 2004 || Socorro || LINEAR || V || align=right data-sort-value="0.99" | 990 m || 
|-id=388 bgcolor=#fefefe
| 160388 ||  || — || June 11, 2004 || Socorro || LINEAR || — || align=right | 1.3 km || 
|-id=389 bgcolor=#fefefe
| 160389 ||  || — || June 15, 2004 || Needville || J. Dellinger, M. Eastman || NYS || align=right data-sort-value="0.79" | 790 m || 
|-id=390 bgcolor=#E9E9E9
| 160390 ||  || — || July 14, 2004 || Reedy Creek || J. Broughton || — || align=right | 1.9 km || 
|-id=391 bgcolor=#fefefe
| 160391 ||  || — || July 14, 2004 || Socorro || LINEAR || — || align=right | 2.7 km || 
|-id=392 bgcolor=#d6d6d6
| 160392 ||  || — || July 16, 2004 || Socorro || LINEAR || — || align=right | 2.9 km || 
|-id=393 bgcolor=#E9E9E9
| 160393 ||  || — || August 6, 2004 || Palomar || NEAT || — || align=right | 2.4 km || 
|-id=394 bgcolor=#d6d6d6
| 160394 ||  || — || August 8, 2004 || Socorro || LINEAR || — || align=right | 4.1 km || 
|-id=395 bgcolor=#d6d6d6
| 160395 ||  || — || August 8, 2004 || Socorro || LINEAR || — || align=right | 3.8 km || 
|-id=396 bgcolor=#fefefe
| 160396 ||  || — || August 10, 2004 || Socorro || LINEAR || — || align=right | 1.2 km || 
|-id=397 bgcolor=#fefefe
| 160397 ||  || — || August 10, 2004 || Socorro || LINEAR || — || align=right | 1.4 km || 
|-id=398 bgcolor=#fefefe
| 160398 ||  || — || August 12, 2004 || Socorro || LINEAR || V || align=right | 1.2 km || 
|-id=399 bgcolor=#fefefe
| 160399 ||  || — || August 12, 2004 || Socorro || LINEAR || — || align=right | 1.5 km || 
|-id=400 bgcolor=#fefefe
| 160400 ||  || — || September 4, 2004 || Palomar || NEAT || — || align=right | 1.0 km || 
|}

160401–160500 

|-bgcolor=#d6d6d6
| 160401 ||  || — || September 7, 2004 || Kitt Peak || Spacewatch || — || align=right | 3.2 km || 
|-id=402 bgcolor=#fefefe
| 160402 ||  || — || September 10, 2004 || Socorro || LINEAR || — || align=right | 1.5 km || 
|-id=403 bgcolor=#fefefe
| 160403 ||  || — || September 10, 2004 || Socorro || LINEAR || — || align=right | 1.4 km || 
|-id=404 bgcolor=#fefefe
| 160404 ||  || — || September 10, 2004 || Socorro || LINEAR || — || align=right | 5.2 km || 
|-id=405 bgcolor=#fefefe
| 160405 ||  || — || September 10, 2004 || Kitt Peak || Spacewatch || — || align=right | 1.0 km || 
|-id=406 bgcolor=#fefefe
| 160406 ||  || — || October 7, 2004 || Socorro || LINEAR || — || align=right | 1.3 km || 
|-id=407 bgcolor=#fefefe
| 160407 ||  || — || October 4, 2004 || Kitt Peak || Spacewatch || V || align=right | 1.2 km || 
|-id=408 bgcolor=#fefefe
| 160408 ||  || — || November 3, 2004 || Kitt Peak || Spacewatch || NYS || align=right | 2.2 km || 
|-id=409 bgcolor=#fefefe
| 160409 ||  || — || November 3, 2004 || Kitt Peak || Spacewatch || FLO || align=right data-sort-value="0.91" | 910 m || 
|-id=410 bgcolor=#fefefe
| 160410 ||  || — || November 2, 2004 || Anderson Mesa || LONEOS || — || align=right | 1.2 km || 
|-id=411 bgcolor=#fefefe
| 160411 ||  || — || November 7, 2004 || Socorro || LINEAR || — || align=right | 2.5 km || 
|-id=412 bgcolor=#fefefe
| 160412 ||  || — || December 2, 2004 || Socorro || LINEAR || — || align=right | 1.6 km || 
|-id=413 bgcolor=#E9E9E9
| 160413 ||  || — || December 9, 2004 || Catalina || CSS || BRU || align=right | 5.6 km || 
|-id=414 bgcolor=#fefefe
| 160414 ||  || — || December 10, 2004 || Socorro || LINEAR || — || align=right | 1.3 km || 
|-id=415 bgcolor=#fefefe
| 160415 ||  || — || December 10, 2004 || Socorro || LINEAR || — || align=right | 1.3 km || 
|-id=416 bgcolor=#E9E9E9
| 160416 ||  || — || December 16, 2004 || Catalina || CSS || — || align=right | 2.4 km || 
|-id=417 bgcolor=#E9E9E9
| 160417 ||  || — || December 18, 2004 || Mount Lemmon || Mount Lemmon Survey || — || align=right | 2.6 km || 
|-id=418 bgcolor=#d6d6d6
| 160418 ||  || — || January 6, 2005 || Catalina || CSS || — || align=right | 6.6 km || 
|-id=419 bgcolor=#fefefe
| 160419 ||  || — || January 15, 2005 || Catalina || CSS || — || align=right | 2.4 km || 
|-id=420 bgcolor=#E9E9E9
| 160420 ||  || — || January 13, 2005 || Kitt Peak || Spacewatch || — || align=right | 3.0 km || 
|-id=421 bgcolor=#fefefe
| 160421 ||  || — || January 17, 2005 || Socorro || LINEAR || NYS || align=right | 1.6 km || 
|-id=422 bgcolor=#d6d6d6
| 160422 ||  || — || February 3, 2005 || Socorro || LINEAR || EOS || align=right | 3.2 km || 
|-id=423 bgcolor=#d6d6d6
| 160423 ||  || — || March 2, 2005 || Kitt Peak || Spacewatch || — || align=right | 7.8 km || 
|-id=424 bgcolor=#d6d6d6
| 160424 ||  || — || March 11, 2005 || Anderson Mesa || LONEOS || — || align=right | 7.4 km || 
|-id=425 bgcolor=#fefefe
| 160425 || 2005 JF || — || May 2, 2005 || Reedy Creek || J. Broughton || — || align=right | 1.3 km || 
|-id=426 bgcolor=#d6d6d6
| 160426 ||  || — || August 27, 2005 || Palomar || NEAT || THM || align=right | 4.3 km || 
|-id=427 bgcolor=#C7FF8F
| 160427 ||  || — || September 3, 2005 || Apache Point || A. C. Becker, A. W. Puckett, J. Kubica || centaur || align=right | 114 km || 
|-id=428 bgcolor=#E9E9E9
| 160428 ||  || — || September 24, 2005 || Kitt Peak || Spacewatch || — || align=right | 2.4 km || 
|-id=429 bgcolor=#fefefe
| 160429 ||  || — || September 23, 2005 || Kitt Peak || Spacewatch || NYS || align=right data-sort-value="0.97" | 970 m || 
|-id=430 bgcolor=#d6d6d6
| 160430 ||  || — || September 23, 2005 || Kitt Peak || Spacewatch || KOR || align=right | 2.6 km || 
|-id=431 bgcolor=#fefefe
| 160431 ||  || — || September 23, 2005 || Kitt Peak || Spacewatch || — || align=right | 1.3 km || 
|-id=432 bgcolor=#fefefe
| 160432 ||  || — || September 24, 2005 || Kitt Peak || Spacewatch || — || align=right data-sort-value="0.94" | 940 m || 
|-id=433 bgcolor=#d6d6d6
| 160433 ||  || — || September 24, 2005 || Kitt Peak || Spacewatch || THM || align=right | 2.6 km || 
|-id=434 bgcolor=#d6d6d6
| 160434 ||  || — || September 24, 2005 || Kitt Peak || Spacewatch || — || align=right | 2.7 km || 
|-id=435 bgcolor=#d6d6d6
| 160435 ||  || — || September 24, 2005 || Kitt Peak || Spacewatch || KOR || align=right | 1.8 km || 
|-id=436 bgcolor=#E9E9E9
| 160436 ||  || — || September 29, 2005 || Palomar || NEAT || — || align=right | 2.6 km || 
|-id=437 bgcolor=#fefefe
| 160437 ||  || — || September 25, 2005 || Kitt Peak || Spacewatch || FLO || align=right data-sort-value="0.96" | 960 m || 
|-id=438 bgcolor=#E9E9E9
| 160438 ||  || — || September 25, 2005 || Kitt Peak || Spacewatch || — || align=right | 2.0 km || 
|-id=439 bgcolor=#E9E9E9
| 160439 ||  || — || September 30, 2005 || Anderson Mesa || LONEOS || — || align=right | 2.8 km || 
|-id=440 bgcolor=#E9E9E9
| 160440 ||  || — || September 30, 2005 || Kitt Peak || Spacewatch || AST || align=right | 2.1 km || 
|-id=441 bgcolor=#E9E9E9
| 160441 ||  || — || September 24, 2005 || Palomar || NEAT || — || align=right | 3.7 km || 
|-id=442 bgcolor=#d6d6d6
| 160442 ||  || — || September 24, 2005 || Palomar || NEAT || HYG || align=right | 4.4 km || 
|-id=443 bgcolor=#E9E9E9
| 160443 ||  || — || October 1, 2005 || Mount Lemmon || Mount Lemmon Survey || — || align=right | 1.6 km || 
|-id=444 bgcolor=#fefefe
| 160444 ||  || — || October 1, 2005 || Catalina || CSS || V || align=right data-sort-value="0.87" | 870 m || 
|-id=445 bgcolor=#d6d6d6
| 160445 ||  || — || October 7, 2005 || Catalina || CSS || — || align=right | 3.4 km || 
|-id=446 bgcolor=#E9E9E9
| 160446 ||  || — || October 25, 2005 || Kitt Peak || Spacewatch || HEN || align=right | 1.3 km || 
|-id=447 bgcolor=#fefefe
| 160447 ||  || — || October 26, 2005 || Kitt Peak || Spacewatch || — || align=right | 1.2 km || 
|-id=448 bgcolor=#E9E9E9
| 160448 ||  || — || October 28, 2005 || Kitt Peak || Spacewatch || — || align=right | 1.2 km || 
|-id=449 bgcolor=#fefefe
| 160449 ||  || — || October 28, 2005 || Kitt Peak || Spacewatch || NYS || align=right | 2.1 km || 
|-id=450 bgcolor=#E9E9E9
| 160450 ||  || — || October 22, 2005 || Catalina || CSS || GEF || align=right | 1.8 km || 
|-id=451 bgcolor=#E9E9E9
| 160451 ||  || — || October 26, 2005 || Palomar || NEAT || ADE || align=right | 4.1 km || 
|-id=452 bgcolor=#E9E9E9
| 160452 ||  || — || October 27, 2005 || Catalina || CSS || — || align=right | 1.8 km || 
|-id=453 bgcolor=#fefefe
| 160453 ||  || — || November 12, 2005 || Socorro || LINEAR || H || align=right | 1.1 km || 
|-id=454 bgcolor=#fefefe
| 160454 ||  || — || November 21, 2005 || Kitt Peak || Spacewatch || MAS || align=right data-sort-value="0.71" | 710 m || 
|-id=455 bgcolor=#d6d6d6
| 160455 ||  || — || November 28, 2005 || Socorro || LINEAR || — || align=right | 3.4 km || 
|-id=456 bgcolor=#fefefe
| 160456 ||  || — || November 28, 2005 || Socorro || LINEAR || H || align=right data-sort-value="0.92" | 920 m || 
|-id=457 bgcolor=#fefefe
| 160457 ||  || — || December 29, 2005 || Palomar || NEAT || — || align=right | 1.4 km || 
|-id=458 bgcolor=#fefefe
| 160458 ||  || — || December 29, 2005 || Palomar || NEAT || H || align=right | 1.1 km || 
|-id=459 bgcolor=#fefefe
| 160459 ||  || — || December 28, 2005 || Mount Lemmon || Mount Lemmon Survey || NYS || align=right | 1.1 km || 
|-id=460 bgcolor=#fefefe
| 160460 ||  || — || January 22, 2006 || Mount Lemmon || Mount Lemmon Survey || FLO || align=right | 1.2 km || 
|-id=461 bgcolor=#fefefe
| 160461 ||  || — || January 23, 2006 || Mount Lemmon || Mount Lemmon Survey || NYS || align=right | 1.4 km || 
|-id=462 bgcolor=#fefefe
| 160462 ||  || — || January 23, 2006 || Kitt Peak || Spacewatch || FLO || align=right | 1.7 km || 
|-id=463 bgcolor=#E9E9E9
| 160463 ||  || — || January 26, 2006 || Kitt Peak || Spacewatch || CLO || align=right | 4.0 km || 
|-id=464 bgcolor=#E9E9E9
| 160464 ||  || — || January 23, 2006 || Catalina || CSS || — || align=right | 3.4 km || 
|-id=465 bgcolor=#C2FFFF
| 160465 ||  || — || January 30, 2006 || Kitt Peak || Spacewatch || L5 || align=right | 11 km || 
|-id=466 bgcolor=#d6d6d6
| 160466 ||  || — || February 3, 2006 || Kitt Peak || Spacewatch || — || align=right | 4.0 km || 
|-id=467 bgcolor=#d6d6d6
| 160467 ||  || — || February 22, 2006 || Mount Lemmon || Mount Lemmon Survey || KOR || align=right | 2.5 km || 
|-id=468 bgcolor=#E9E9E9
| 160468 ||  || — || February 24, 2006 || Palomar || NEAT || — || align=right | 3.8 km || 
|-id=469 bgcolor=#E9E9E9
| 160469 ||  || — || February 27, 2006 || Catalina || CSS || EUN || align=right | 2.9 km || 
|-id=470 bgcolor=#d6d6d6
| 160470 ||  || — || March 23, 2006 || Mount Lemmon || Mount Lemmon Survey || — || align=right | 4.0 km || 
|-id=471 bgcolor=#d6d6d6
| 160471 ||  || — || March 25, 2006 || Catalina || CSS || — || align=right | 6.1 km || 
|-id=472 bgcolor=#d6d6d6
| 160472 ||  || — || April 19, 2006 || Catalina || CSS || — || align=right | 4.4 km || 
|-id=473 bgcolor=#fefefe
| 160473 ||  || — || April 26, 2006 || Kitt Peak || Spacewatch || — || align=right | 1.4 km || 
|-id=474 bgcolor=#d6d6d6
| 160474 ||  || — || May 3, 2006 || Kitt Peak || Spacewatch || — || align=right | 6.2 km || 
|-id=475 bgcolor=#d6d6d6
| 160475 ||  || — || May 20, 2006 || Kitt Peak || Spacewatch || — || align=right | 4.7 km || 
|-id=476 bgcolor=#fefefe
| 160476 ||  || — || September 19, 2006 || Catalina || CSS || — || align=right | 1.4 km || 
|-id=477 bgcolor=#d6d6d6
| 160477 ||  || — || November 15, 2006 || Mount Lemmon || Mount Lemmon Survey || — || align=right | 6.6 km || 
|-id=478 bgcolor=#E9E9E9
| 160478 ||  || — || November 18, 2006 || Kitt Peak || Spacewatch || — || align=right | 3.2 km || 
|-id=479 bgcolor=#d6d6d6
| 160479 ||  || — || November 23, 2006 || Kitt Peak || Spacewatch || THM || align=right | 2.8 km || 
|-id=480 bgcolor=#E9E9E9
| 160480 ||  || — || December 12, 2006 || Catalina || CSS || — || align=right | 3.4 km || 
|-id=481 bgcolor=#d6d6d6
| 160481 ||  || — || December 9, 2006 || Kitt Peak || Spacewatch || — || align=right | 4.7 km || 
|-id=482 bgcolor=#E9E9E9
| 160482 ||  || — || January 8, 2007 || Mount Lemmon || Mount Lemmon Survey || — || align=right | 1.0 km || 
|-id=483 bgcolor=#d6d6d6
| 160483 ||  || — || January 10, 2007 || Kitt Peak || Spacewatch || CRO || align=right | 5.9 km || 
|-id=484 bgcolor=#fefefe
| 160484 ||  || — || January 10, 2007 || Kitt Peak || Spacewatch || — || align=right | 1.3 km || 
|-id=485 bgcolor=#d6d6d6
| 160485 ||  || — || January 16, 2007 || Anderson Mesa || LONEOS || EOS || align=right | 2.7 km || 
|-id=486 bgcolor=#fefefe
| 160486 ||  || — || January 17, 2007 || Kitt Peak || Spacewatch || — || align=right data-sort-value="0.86" | 860 m || 
|-id=487 bgcolor=#fefefe
| 160487 ||  || — || January 23, 2007 || Anderson Mesa || LONEOS || MAS || align=right | 1.2 km || 
|-id=488 bgcolor=#d6d6d6
| 160488 ||  || — || January 24, 2007 || Mount Lemmon || Mount Lemmon Survey || — || align=right | 4.0 km || 
|-id=489 bgcolor=#fefefe
| 160489 ||  || — || January 25, 2007 || Catalina || CSS || — || align=right | 1.0 km || 
|-id=490 bgcolor=#E9E9E9
| 160490 ||  || — || January 25, 2007 || Catalina || CSS || — || align=right | 1.0 km || 
|-id=491 bgcolor=#d6d6d6
| 160491 ||  || — || February 6, 2007 || Mount Lemmon || Mount Lemmon Survey || EOS || align=right | 2.2 km || 
|-id=492 bgcolor=#d6d6d6
| 160492 ||  || — || February 6, 2007 || Palomar || NEAT || — || align=right | 4.8 km || 
|-id=493 bgcolor=#E9E9E9
| 160493 Nantou ||  ||  || February 6, 2007 || Lulin Observatory || Q.-z. Ye, H.-C. Lin || — || align=right | 2.5 km || 
|-id=494 bgcolor=#E9E9E9
| 160494 ||  || — || February 6, 2007 || Palomar || NEAT || — || align=right | 3.5 km || 
|-id=495 bgcolor=#E9E9E9
| 160495 ||  || — || February 8, 2007 || Catalina || CSS || KON || align=right | 4.0 km || 
|-id=496 bgcolor=#d6d6d6
| 160496 ||  || — || February 10, 2007 || Catalina || CSS || LUT || align=right | 6.3 km || 
|-id=497 bgcolor=#E9E9E9
| 160497 ||  || — || February 15, 2007 || Catalina || CSS || ADE || align=right | 2.7 km || 
|-id=498 bgcolor=#fefefe
| 160498 ||  || — || February 15, 2007 || Catalina || CSS || — || align=right data-sort-value="0.96" | 960 m || 
|-id=499 bgcolor=#E9E9E9
| 160499 ||  || — || February 16, 2007 || Catalina || CSS || ADE || align=right | 2.1 km || 
|-id=500 bgcolor=#fefefe
| 160500 ||  || — || February 17, 2007 || Kitt Peak || Spacewatch || NYS || align=right data-sort-value="0.71" | 710 m || 
|}

160501–160600 

|-bgcolor=#E9E9E9
| 160501 ||  || — || March 10, 2007 || Socorro || LINEAR || — || align=right | 2.3 km || 
|-id=502 bgcolor=#E9E9E9
| 160502 ||  || — || March 20, 2007 || Mount Lemmon || Mount Lemmon Survey || MAR || align=right | 1.4 km || 
|-id=503 bgcolor=#E9E9E9
| 160503 ||  || — || April 16, 2007 || Catalina || CSS || — || align=right | 4.6 km || 
|-id=504 bgcolor=#fefefe
| 160504 ||  || — || April 20, 2007 || Kitt Peak || Spacewatch || FLO || align=right data-sort-value="0.69" | 690 m || 
|-id=505 bgcolor=#E9E9E9
| 160505 ||  || — || May 11, 2007 || Tiki || S. F. Hönig, N. Teamo || — || align=right | 1.8 km || 
|-id=506 bgcolor=#d6d6d6
| 160506 ||  || — || May 11, 2007 || Kitt Peak || Spacewatch || — || align=right | 4.2 km || 
|-id=507 bgcolor=#fefefe
| 160507 || 3204 T-3 || — || October 16, 1977 || Palomar || PLS || NYS || align=right | 1.1 km || 
|-id=508 bgcolor=#fefefe
| 160508 || 4319 T-3 || — || October 16, 1977 || Palomar || PLS || — || align=right | 1.3 km || 
|-id=509 bgcolor=#d6d6d6
| 160509 ||  || — || March 4, 1990 || Siding Spring || R. H. McNaught || MEL || align=right | 7.4 km || 
|-id=510 bgcolor=#FA8072
| 160510 ||  || — || September 14, 1990 || Palomar || H. E. Holt || — || align=right | 1.9 km || 
|-id=511 bgcolor=#E9E9E9
| 160511 ||  || — || September 16, 1990 || Palomar || H. E. Holt || — || align=right | 5.0 km || 
|-id=512 bgcolor=#E9E9E9
| 160512 Franck-Hertz ||  ||  || October 11, 1990 || Tautenburg Observatory || F. Börngen, L. D. Schmadel || — || align=right | 2.1 km || 
|-id=513 bgcolor=#E9E9E9
| 160513 ||  || — || October 12, 1990 || Tautenburg Observatory || F. Börngen, L. D. Schmadel || — || align=right | 2.5 km || 
|-id=514 bgcolor=#d6d6d6
| 160514 ||  || — || August 7, 1991 || Palomar || H. E. Holt || — || align=right | 6.6 km || 
|-id=515 bgcolor=#fefefe
| 160515 ||  || — || September 14, 1993 || La Silla || H. Debehogne, E. W. Elst || — || align=right | 1.2 km || 
|-id=516 bgcolor=#E9E9E9
| 160516 ||  || — || August 12, 1994 || La Silla || E. W. Elst || — || align=right | 2.3 km || 
|-id=517 bgcolor=#E9E9E9
| 160517 ||  || — || October 2, 1994 || Kitt Peak || Spacewatch || MIS || align=right | 3.3 km || 
|-id=518 bgcolor=#fefefe
| 160518 ||  || — || November 1, 1994 || Kitt Peak || Spacewatch || FLO || align=right | 1.1 km || 
|-id=519 bgcolor=#FA8072
| 160519 ||  || — || February 1, 1995 || Kitt Peak || Spacewatch || — || align=right | 1.5 km || 
|-id=520 bgcolor=#fefefe
| 160520 ||  || — || April 2, 1995 || Kitt Peak || Spacewatch || NYS || align=right | 1.2 km || 
|-id=521 bgcolor=#E9E9E9
| 160521 || 1995 KU || — || May 21, 1995 || Xinglong || SCAP || — || align=right | 2.2 km || 
|-id=522 bgcolor=#E9E9E9
| 160522 ||  || — || September 20, 1995 || Kitt Peak || Spacewatch || — || align=right | 2.8 km || 
|-id=523 bgcolor=#E9E9E9
| 160523 ||  || — || September 25, 1995 || Kitt Peak || Spacewatch || MIS || align=right | 3.7 km || 
|-id=524 bgcolor=#E9E9E9
| 160524 ||  || — || January 19, 1996 || Kitt Peak || Spacewatch || — || align=right | 2.2 km || 
|-id=525 bgcolor=#fefefe
| 160525 ||  || — || March 12, 1996 || Kitt Peak || Spacewatch || FLO || align=right | 1.2 km || 
|-id=526 bgcolor=#fefefe
| 160526 ||  || — || September 13, 1996 || Church Stretton || S. P. Laurie || — || align=right | 1.8 km || 
|-id=527 bgcolor=#C2FFFF
| 160527 ||  || — || September 13, 1996 || La Silla || UDTS || L4 || align=right | 18 km || 
|-id=528 bgcolor=#C2FFFF
| 160528 ||  || — || September 14, 1996 || La Silla || UDTS || L4 || align=right | 14 km || 
|-id=529 bgcolor=#fefefe
| 160529 ||  || — || October 6, 1996 || Rand || G. R. Viscome || V || align=right | 1.7 km || 
|-id=530 bgcolor=#E9E9E9
| 160530 ||  || — || October 4, 1996 || Kitt Peak || Spacewatch || WIT || align=right | 1.8 km || 
|-id=531 bgcolor=#d6d6d6
| 160531 ||  || — || October 4, 1996 || La Silla || E. W. Elst || — || align=right | 7.1 km || 
|-id=532 bgcolor=#fefefe
| 160532 ||  || — || October 4, 1996 || La Silla || E. W. Elst || — || align=right | 1.6 km || 
|-id=533 bgcolor=#C2FFFF
| 160533 ||  || — || October 2, 1996 || La Silla || E. W. Elst || L4 || align=right | 18 km || 
|-id=534 bgcolor=#C2FFFF
| 160534 ||  || — || October 2, 1996 || La Silla || E. W. Elst || L4 || align=right | 17 km || 
|-id=535 bgcolor=#fefefe
| 160535 ||  || — || October 6, 1996 || La Silla || E. W. Elst || KLI || align=right | 3.6 km || 
|-id=536 bgcolor=#E9E9E9
| 160536 ||  || — || October 18, 1996 || Kitt Peak || Spacewatch || HEN || align=right | 1.8 km || 
|-id=537 bgcolor=#fefefe
| 160537 ||  || — || December 4, 1996 || Kitt Peak || Spacewatch || V || align=right | 1.2 km || 
|-id=538 bgcolor=#E9E9E9
| 160538 ||  || — || February 2, 1997 || Kitt Peak || Spacewatch || — || align=right | 2.7 km || 
|-id=539 bgcolor=#fefefe
| 160539 || 1997 SG || — || September 20, 1997 || Kleť || Kleť Obs. || — || align=right | 1.8 km || 
|-id=540 bgcolor=#d6d6d6
| 160540 ||  || — || November 30, 1997 || La Silla || UDTS || — || align=right | 3.3 km || 
|-id=541 bgcolor=#FA8072
| 160541 ||  || — || November 26, 1997 || La Silla || UDTS || — || align=right | 1.9 km || 
|-id=542 bgcolor=#fefefe
| 160542 ||  || — || March 20, 1998 || Socorro || LINEAR || FLO || align=right | 1.1 km || 
|-id=543 bgcolor=#E9E9E9
| 160543 ||  || — || April 2, 1998 || Socorro || LINEAR || — || align=right | 2.5 km || 
|-id=544 bgcolor=#E9E9E9
| 160544 ||  || — || April 21, 1998 || Caussols || ODAS || MIS || align=right | 3.1 km || 
|-id=545 bgcolor=#E9E9E9
| 160545 ||  || — || May 22, 1998 || Kitt Peak || Spacewatch || — || align=right | 4.5 km || 
|-id=546 bgcolor=#E9E9E9
| 160546 ||  || — || June 18, 1998 || Kitt Peak || Spacewatch || — || align=right | 2.5 km || 
|-id=547 bgcolor=#E9E9E9
| 160547 ||  || — || June 27, 1998 || Kitt Peak || Spacewatch || — || align=right | 4.7 km || 
|-id=548 bgcolor=#E9E9E9
| 160548 ||  || — || July 24, 1998 || Caussols || ODAS || AEO || align=right | 1.5 km || 
|-id=549 bgcolor=#E9E9E9
| 160549 ||  || — || August 17, 1998 || Socorro || LINEAR || — || align=right | 5.6 km || 
|-id=550 bgcolor=#E9E9E9
| 160550 ||  || — || August 17, 1998 || Socorro || LINEAR || — || align=right | 5.5 km || 
|-id=551 bgcolor=#E9E9E9
| 160551 ||  || — || August 17, 1998 || Socorro || LINEAR || INO || align=right | 2.5 km || 
|-id=552 bgcolor=#E9E9E9
| 160552 ||  || — || August 24, 1998 || Socorro || LINEAR || — || align=right | 3.5 km || 
|-id=553 bgcolor=#E9E9E9
| 160553 ||  || — || August 24, 1998 || Socorro || LINEAR || — || align=right | 4.5 km || 
|-id=554 bgcolor=#E9E9E9
| 160554 ||  || — || August 24, 1998 || Socorro || LINEAR || — || align=right | 5.8 km || 
|-id=555 bgcolor=#E9E9E9
| 160555 ||  || — || September 12, 1998 || Oizumi || T. Kobayashi || — || align=right | 5.7 km || 
|-id=556 bgcolor=#E9E9E9
| 160556 ||  || — || September 14, 1998 || Socorro || LINEAR || — || align=right | 4.0 km || 
|-id=557 bgcolor=#E9E9E9
| 160557 ||  || — || September 14, 1998 || Socorro || LINEAR || — || align=right | 5.2 km || 
|-id=558 bgcolor=#E9E9E9
| 160558 ||  || — || September 14, 1998 || Socorro || LINEAR || — || align=right | 3.7 km || 
|-id=559 bgcolor=#E9E9E9
| 160559 ||  || — || September 14, 1998 || Socorro || LINEAR || — || align=right | 5.7 km || 
|-id=560 bgcolor=#d6d6d6
| 160560 ||  || — || September 20, 1998 || Kitt Peak || Spacewatch || — || align=right | 3.9 km || 
|-id=561 bgcolor=#E9E9E9
| 160561 ||  || — || September 23, 1998 || Catalina || CSS || — || align=right | 5.7 km || 
|-id=562 bgcolor=#E9E9E9
| 160562 ||  || — || September 21, 1998 || La Silla || E. W. Elst || — || align=right | 4.2 km || 
|-id=563 bgcolor=#E9E9E9
| 160563 ||  || — || September 26, 1998 || Socorro || LINEAR || MRX || align=right | 1.9 km || 
|-id=564 bgcolor=#E9E9E9
| 160564 ||  || — || September 26, 1998 || Socorro || LINEAR || — || align=right | 4.2 km || 
|-id=565 bgcolor=#fefefe
| 160565 ||  || — || September 26, 1998 || Socorro || LINEAR || — || align=right | 1.4 km || 
|-id=566 bgcolor=#E9E9E9
| 160566 ||  || — || September 26, 1998 || Socorro || LINEAR || DOR || align=right | 4.6 km || 
|-id=567 bgcolor=#E9E9E9
| 160567 ||  || — || October 12, 1998 || Kitt Peak || Spacewatch || — || align=right | 6.2 km || 
|-id=568 bgcolor=#E9E9E9
| 160568 ||  || — || October 28, 1998 || Socorro || LINEAR || — || align=right | 6.6 km || 
|-id=569 bgcolor=#E9E9E9
| 160569 ||  || — || November 10, 1998 || Socorro || LINEAR || POS || align=right | 6.4 km || 
|-id=570 bgcolor=#E9E9E9
| 160570 ||  || — || November 13, 1998 || Socorro || LINEAR || — || align=right | 4.3 km || 
|-id=571 bgcolor=#d6d6d6
| 160571 ||  || — || November 21, 1998 || Socorro || LINEAR || — || align=right | 5.0 km || 
|-id=572 bgcolor=#d6d6d6
| 160572 ||  || — || February 10, 1999 || Socorro || LINEAR || — || align=right | 4.5 km || 
|-id=573 bgcolor=#fefefe
| 160573 ||  || — || February 10, 1999 || Kitt Peak || Spacewatch || — || align=right | 1.0 km || 
|-id=574 bgcolor=#fefefe
| 160574 ||  || — || March 15, 1999 || Kitt Peak || Spacewatch || FLO || align=right | 1.0 km || 
|-id=575 bgcolor=#fefefe
| 160575 ||  || — || April 13, 1999 || Majorca || OAM Obs. || — || align=right | 1.5 km || 
|-id=576 bgcolor=#fefefe
| 160576 ||  || — || April 19, 1999 || Kitt Peak || Spacewatch || NYS || align=right | 1.4 km || 
|-id=577 bgcolor=#fefefe
| 160577 ||  || — || May 10, 1999 || Socorro || LINEAR || — || align=right | 3.3 km || 
|-id=578 bgcolor=#E9E9E9
| 160578 ||  || — || May 12, 1999 || Socorro || LINEAR || — || align=right | 5.1 km || 
|-id=579 bgcolor=#E9E9E9
| 160579 ||  || — || May 7, 1999 || Catalina || CSS || — || align=right | 3.1 km || 
|-id=580 bgcolor=#E9E9E9
| 160580 || 1999 KG || — || May 16, 1999 || Kitt Peak || Spacewatch || EUN || align=right | 2.2 km || 
|-id=581 bgcolor=#d6d6d6
| 160581 ||  || — || May 18, 1999 || Socorro || LINEAR || — || align=right | 5.3 km || 
|-id=582 bgcolor=#E9E9E9
| 160582 ||  || — || July 13, 1999 || Socorro || LINEAR || — || align=right | 3.0 km || 
|-id=583 bgcolor=#fefefe
| 160583 ||  || — || July 14, 1999 || Socorro || LINEAR || — || align=right | 2.1 km || 
|-id=584 bgcolor=#fefefe
| 160584 ||  || — || July 14, 1999 || Socorro || LINEAR || — || align=right | 1.8 km || 
|-id=585 bgcolor=#E9E9E9
| 160585 ||  || — || September 5, 1999 || Kitt Peak || Spacewatch || — || align=right | 1.4 km || 
|-id=586 bgcolor=#E9E9E9
| 160586 ||  || — || September 3, 1999 || Kitt Peak || Spacewatch || EUN || align=right | 1.9 km || 
|-id=587 bgcolor=#E9E9E9
| 160587 ||  || — || September 7, 1999 || Socorro || LINEAR || — || align=right | 2.5 km || 
|-id=588 bgcolor=#E9E9E9
| 160588 ||  || — || September 7, 1999 || Socorro || LINEAR || KON || align=right | 3.6 km || 
|-id=589 bgcolor=#E9E9E9
| 160589 ||  || — || September 7, 1999 || Socorro || LINEAR || — || align=right | 2.1 km || 
|-id=590 bgcolor=#E9E9E9
| 160590 ||  || — || September 8, 1999 || Fountain Hills || C. W. Juels || — || align=right | 1.7 km || 
|-id=591 bgcolor=#E9E9E9
| 160591 ||  || — || September 7, 1999 || Socorro || LINEAR || — || align=right | 1.6 km || 
|-id=592 bgcolor=#E9E9E9
| 160592 ||  || — || September 7, 1999 || Socorro || LINEAR || — || align=right | 1.9 km || 
|-id=593 bgcolor=#E9E9E9
| 160593 ||  || — || September 8, 1999 || Socorro || LINEAR || — || align=right | 1.4 km || 
|-id=594 bgcolor=#E9E9E9
| 160594 ||  || — || September 9, 1999 || Socorro || LINEAR || — || align=right | 2.0 km || 
|-id=595 bgcolor=#E9E9E9
| 160595 ||  || — || September 9, 1999 || Socorro || LINEAR || — || align=right | 1.5 km || 
|-id=596 bgcolor=#E9E9E9
| 160596 ||  || — || September 9, 1999 || Socorro || LINEAR || — || align=right | 2.3 km || 
|-id=597 bgcolor=#E9E9E9
| 160597 ||  || — || September 9, 1999 || Socorro || LINEAR || — || align=right | 1.4 km || 
|-id=598 bgcolor=#E9E9E9
| 160598 ||  || — || September 9, 1999 || Socorro || LINEAR || — || align=right | 1.8 km || 
|-id=599 bgcolor=#E9E9E9
| 160599 ||  || — || September 9, 1999 || Socorro || LINEAR || — || align=right | 3.7 km || 
|-id=600 bgcolor=#E9E9E9
| 160600 ||  || — || September 8, 1999 || Socorro || LINEAR || — || align=right | 3.8 km || 
|}

160601–160700 

|-bgcolor=#E9E9E9
| 160601 ||  || — || September 8, 1999 || Catalina || CSS || — || align=right | 5.0 km || 
|-id=602 bgcolor=#E9E9E9
| 160602 ||  || — || September 8, 1999 || Socorro || LINEAR || BRG || align=right | 2.8 km || 
|-id=603 bgcolor=#E9E9E9
| 160603 ||  || — || September 29, 1999 || Catalina || CSS || — || align=right | 1.5 km || 
|-id=604 bgcolor=#E9E9E9
| 160604 ||  || — || October 8, 1999 || Monte Agliale || S. Donati || — || align=right | 2.5 km || 
|-id=605 bgcolor=#E9E9E9
| 160605 ||  || — || October 12, 1999 || Kleť || Kleť Obs. || — || align=right | 2.0 km || 
|-id=606 bgcolor=#E9E9E9
| 160606 ||  || — || October 3, 1999 || Socorro || LINEAR || — || align=right | 1.7 km || 
|-id=607 bgcolor=#E9E9E9
| 160607 ||  || — || October 3, 1999 || Socorro || LINEAR || — || align=right | 2.1 km || 
|-id=608 bgcolor=#E9E9E9
| 160608 ||  || — || October 4, 1999 || Socorro || LINEAR || — || align=right | 1.7 km || 
|-id=609 bgcolor=#fefefe
| 160609 ||  || — || October 3, 1999 || Socorro || LINEAR || H || align=right | 1.4 km || 
|-id=610 bgcolor=#fefefe
| 160610 ||  || — || October 4, 1999 || Kitt Peak || Spacewatch || — || align=right | 1.5 km || 
|-id=611 bgcolor=#fefefe
| 160611 ||  || — || October 4, 1999 || Kitt Peak || Spacewatch || V || align=right data-sort-value="0.71" | 710 m || 
|-id=612 bgcolor=#E9E9E9
| 160612 ||  || — || October 8, 1999 || Kitt Peak || Spacewatch || — || align=right | 1.4 km || 
|-id=613 bgcolor=#d6d6d6
| 160613 ||  || — || October 8, 1999 || Kitt Peak || Spacewatch || THM || align=right | 3.6 km || 
|-id=614 bgcolor=#E9E9E9
| 160614 ||  || — || October 12, 1999 || Kitt Peak || Spacewatch || — || align=right | 1.2 km || 
|-id=615 bgcolor=#E9E9E9
| 160615 ||  || — || October 2, 1999 || Socorro || LINEAR || — || align=right | 3.7 km || 
|-id=616 bgcolor=#E9E9E9
| 160616 ||  || — || October 2, 1999 || Socorro || LINEAR || — || align=right | 2.1 km || 
|-id=617 bgcolor=#E9E9E9
| 160617 ||  || — || October 2, 1999 || Socorro || LINEAR || — || align=right | 1.8 km || 
|-id=618 bgcolor=#E9E9E9
| 160618 ||  || — || October 3, 1999 || Socorro || LINEAR || — || align=right | 1.6 km || 
|-id=619 bgcolor=#E9E9E9
| 160619 ||  || — || October 4, 1999 || Socorro || LINEAR || — || align=right | 2.4 km || 
|-id=620 bgcolor=#E9E9E9
| 160620 ||  || — || October 4, 1999 || Socorro || LINEAR || — || align=right | 1.8 km || 
|-id=621 bgcolor=#E9E9E9
| 160621 ||  || — || October 4, 1999 || Socorro || LINEAR || — || align=right | 1.7 km || 
|-id=622 bgcolor=#E9E9E9
| 160622 ||  || — || October 7, 1999 || Socorro || LINEAR || — || align=right | 2.2 km || 
|-id=623 bgcolor=#E9E9E9
| 160623 ||  || — || October 12, 1999 || Socorro || LINEAR || — || align=right | 2.7 km || 
|-id=624 bgcolor=#E9E9E9
| 160624 ||  || — || October 12, 1999 || Socorro || LINEAR || — || align=right | 3.3 km || 
|-id=625 bgcolor=#E9E9E9
| 160625 ||  || — || October 4, 1999 || Catalina || CSS || — || align=right | 1.3 km || 
|-id=626 bgcolor=#fefefe
| 160626 ||  || — || October 3, 1999 || Socorro || LINEAR || — || align=right | 1.4 km || 
|-id=627 bgcolor=#E9E9E9
| 160627 ||  || — || October 1, 1999 || Catalina || CSS || — || align=right | 1.7 km || 
|-id=628 bgcolor=#E9E9E9
| 160628 ||  || — || October 31, 1999 || Kitt Peak || Spacewatch || — || align=right | 1.7 km || 
|-id=629 bgcolor=#E9E9E9
| 160629 ||  || — || October 31, 1999 || Catalina || CSS || — || align=right | 2.1 km || 
|-id=630 bgcolor=#E9E9E9
| 160630 ||  || — || November 3, 1999 || Socorro || LINEAR || — || align=right | 1.8 km || 
|-id=631 bgcolor=#E9E9E9
| 160631 ||  || — || November 3, 1999 || Socorro || LINEAR || — || align=right | 2.7 km || 
|-id=632 bgcolor=#E9E9E9
| 160632 ||  || — || November 4, 1999 || Catalina || CSS || — || align=right | 2.2 km || 
|-id=633 bgcolor=#fefefe
| 160633 ||  || — || November 3, 1999 || Socorro || LINEAR || H || align=right | 1.0 km || 
|-id=634 bgcolor=#E9E9E9
| 160634 ||  || — || November 4, 1999 || Socorro || LINEAR || — || align=right | 3.1 km || 
|-id=635 bgcolor=#fefefe
| 160635 ||  || — || November 1, 1999 || Kitt Peak || Spacewatch || H || align=right | 1.1 km || 
|-id=636 bgcolor=#d6d6d6
| 160636 ||  || — || November 2, 1999 || Kitt Peak || Spacewatch || EOS || align=right | 4.3 km || 
|-id=637 bgcolor=#E9E9E9
| 160637 ||  || — || November 4, 1999 || Socorro || LINEAR || — || align=right | 2.1 km || 
|-id=638 bgcolor=#E9E9E9
| 160638 ||  || — || November 9, 1999 || Socorro || LINEAR || — || align=right | 2.3 km || 
|-id=639 bgcolor=#E9E9E9
| 160639 ||  || — || November 4, 1999 || Kitt Peak || Spacewatch || — || align=right | 1.8 km || 
|-id=640 bgcolor=#E9E9E9
| 160640 ||  || — || November 14, 1999 || Socorro || LINEAR || — || align=right | 2.0 km || 
|-id=641 bgcolor=#E9E9E9
| 160641 ||  || — || November 14, 1999 || Socorro || LINEAR || — || align=right | 2.8 km || 
|-id=642 bgcolor=#E9E9E9
| 160642 ||  || — || November 9, 1999 || Socorro || LINEAR || — || align=right | 2.9 km || 
|-id=643 bgcolor=#E9E9E9
| 160643 ||  || — || December 4, 1999 || Catalina || CSS || — || align=right | 2.0 km || 
|-id=644 bgcolor=#E9E9E9
| 160644 ||  || — || December 5, 1999 || Catalina || CSS || — || align=right | 2.3 km || 
|-id=645 bgcolor=#E9E9E9
| 160645 ||  || — || December 7, 1999 || Socorro || LINEAR || — || align=right | 5.4 km || 
|-id=646 bgcolor=#E9E9E9
| 160646 ||  || — || December 7, 1999 || Socorro || LINEAR || — || align=right | 2.9 km || 
|-id=647 bgcolor=#E9E9E9
| 160647 ||  || — || December 7, 1999 || Socorro || LINEAR || — || align=right | 2.0 km || 
|-id=648 bgcolor=#E9E9E9
| 160648 ||  || — || December 7, 1999 || Socorro || LINEAR || — || align=right | 5.5 km || 
|-id=649 bgcolor=#E9E9E9
| 160649 ||  || — || December 7, 1999 || Socorro || LINEAR || — || align=right | 2.1 km || 
|-id=650 bgcolor=#E9E9E9
| 160650 ||  || — || December 7, 1999 || Socorro || LINEAR || — || align=right | 2.0 km || 
|-id=651 bgcolor=#E9E9E9
| 160651 ||  || — || December 7, 1999 || Socorro || LINEAR || — || align=right | 3.0 km || 
|-id=652 bgcolor=#E9E9E9
| 160652 ||  || — || December 4, 1999 || Catalina || CSS || — || align=right | 1.8 km || 
|-id=653 bgcolor=#E9E9E9
| 160653 ||  || — || December 11, 1999 || Socorro || LINEAR || MIT || align=right | 3.2 km || 
|-id=654 bgcolor=#E9E9E9
| 160654 ||  || — || December 11, 1999 || Socorro || LINEAR || — || align=right | 2.5 km || 
|-id=655 bgcolor=#E9E9E9
| 160655 ||  || — || December 11, 1999 || Socorro || LINEAR || MAR || align=right | 2.4 km || 
|-id=656 bgcolor=#E9E9E9
| 160656 ||  || — || December 5, 1999 || Catalina || CSS || — || align=right | 2.3 km || 
|-id=657 bgcolor=#fefefe
| 160657 ||  || — || December 12, 1999 || Socorro || LINEAR || H || align=right | 1.2 km || 
|-id=658 bgcolor=#E9E9E9
| 160658 ||  || — || December 7, 1999 || Socorro || LINEAR || — || align=right | 4.9 km || 
|-id=659 bgcolor=#E9E9E9
| 160659 ||  || — || December 8, 1999 || Socorro || LINEAR || — || align=right | 2.2 km || 
|-id=660 bgcolor=#E9E9E9
| 160660 ||  || — || December 12, 1999 || Socorro || LINEAR || IAN || align=right | 1.7 km || 
|-id=661 bgcolor=#C2FFFF
| 160661 ||  || — || December 13, 1999 || Kitt Peak || Spacewatch || L4ERY || align=right | 13 km || 
|-id=662 bgcolor=#E9E9E9
| 160662 ||  || — || December 5, 1999 || Kitt Peak || Spacewatch || — || align=right | 3.7 km || 
|-id=663 bgcolor=#E9E9E9
| 160663 ||  || — || December 9, 1999 || Anderson Mesa || LONEOS || — || align=right | 3.5 km || 
|-id=664 bgcolor=#E9E9E9
| 160664 ||  || — || January 2, 2000 || Socorro || LINEAR || EUN || align=right | 2.8 km || 
|-id=665 bgcolor=#E9E9E9
| 160665 ||  || — || January 2, 2000 || Socorro || LINEAR || — || align=right | 2.1 km || 
|-id=666 bgcolor=#E9E9E9
| 160666 ||  || — || January 5, 2000 || Socorro || LINEAR || EUN || align=right | 2.3 km || 
|-id=667 bgcolor=#E9E9E9
| 160667 ||  || — || January 5, 2000 || Socorro || LINEAR || — || align=right | 3.4 km || 
|-id=668 bgcolor=#E9E9E9
| 160668 ||  || — || January 3, 2000 || Socorro || LINEAR || — || align=right | 2.5 km || 
|-id=669 bgcolor=#E9E9E9
| 160669 ||  || — || January 7, 2000 || Socorro || LINEAR || — || align=right | 2.7 km || 
|-id=670 bgcolor=#fefefe
| 160670 ||  || — || January 7, 2000 || Kitt Peak || Spacewatch || V || align=right | 1.4 km || 
|-id=671 bgcolor=#E9E9E9
| 160671 ||  || — || January 6, 2000 || Socorro || LINEAR || — || align=right | 1.6 km || 
|-id=672 bgcolor=#fefefe
| 160672 ||  || — || January 26, 2000 || Kitt Peak || Spacewatch || EUT || align=right data-sort-value="0.97" | 970 m || 
|-id=673 bgcolor=#E9E9E9
| 160673 ||  || — || January 30, 2000 || Socorro || LINEAR || — || align=right | 2.4 km || 
|-id=674 bgcolor=#d6d6d6
| 160674 ||  || — || February 2, 2000 || Socorro || LINEAR || — || align=right | 4.6 km || 
|-id=675 bgcolor=#E9E9E9
| 160675 ||  || — || February 2, 2000 || Socorro || LINEAR || — || align=right | 2.5 km || 
|-id=676 bgcolor=#E9E9E9
| 160676 ||  || — || February 4, 2000 || Socorro || LINEAR || — || align=right | 5.3 km || 
|-id=677 bgcolor=#E9E9E9
| 160677 ||  || — || February 4, 2000 || Socorro || LINEAR || — || align=right | 3.6 km || 
|-id=678 bgcolor=#E9E9E9
| 160678 ||  || — || February 6, 2000 || Kitt Peak || Spacewatch || — || align=right | 4.6 km || 
|-id=679 bgcolor=#C2FFFF
| 160679 ||  || — || February 28, 2000 || Socorro || LINEAR || L4 || align=right | 20 km || 
|-id=680 bgcolor=#d6d6d6
| 160680 ||  || — || February 27, 2000 || Kitt Peak || Spacewatch || — || align=right | 5.6 km || 
|-id=681 bgcolor=#E9E9E9
| 160681 ||  || — || February 29, 2000 || Socorro || LINEAR || — || align=right | 4.8 km || 
|-id=682 bgcolor=#d6d6d6
| 160682 ||  || — || February 29, 2000 || Socorro || LINEAR || EOS || align=right | 3.8 km || 
|-id=683 bgcolor=#E9E9E9
| 160683 ||  || — || February 29, 2000 || Socorro || LINEAR || — || align=right | 4.7 km || 
|-id=684 bgcolor=#fefefe
| 160684 ||  || — || March 3, 2000 || Socorro || LINEAR || EUT || align=right data-sort-value="0.96" | 960 m || 
|-id=685 bgcolor=#d6d6d6
| 160685 ||  || — || March 9, 2000 || Socorro || LINEAR || — || align=right | 4.1 km || 
|-id=686 bgcolor=#d6d6d6
| 160686 ||  || — || March 9, 2000 || Socorro || LINEAR || EOS || align=right | 3.6 km || 
|-id=687 bgcolor=#d6d6d6
| 160687 ||  || — || March 3, 2000 || Socorro || LINEAR || — || align=right | 5.2 km || 
|-id=688 bgcolor=#E9E9E9
| 160688 ||  || — || April 4, 2000 || Socorro || LINEAR || — || align=right | 1.5 km || 
|-id=689 bgcolor=#d6d6d6
| 160689 ||  || — || April 5, 2000 || Socorro || LINEAR || — || align=right | 6.8 km || 
|-id=690 bgcolor=#fefefe
| 160690 ||  || — || April 25, 2000 || Kitt Peak || Spacewatch || — || align=right | 2.8 km || 
|-id=691 bgcolor=#fefefe
| 160691 ||  || — || April 28, 2000 || Socorro || LINEAR || NYS || align=right | 1.2 km || 
|-id=692 bgcolor=#fefefe
| 160692 ||  || — || April 24, 2000 || Kitt Peak || Spacewatch || — || align=right | 1.1 km || 
|-id=693 bgcolor=#fefefe
| 160693 ||  || — || April 24, 2000 || Anderson Mesa || LONEOS || — || align=right | 1.2 km || 
|-id=694 bgcolor=#E9E9E9
| 160694 ||  || — || May 1, 2000 || Anderson Mesa || LONEOS || — || align=right | 3.6 km || 
|-id=695 bgcolor=#fefefe
| 160695 ||  || — || May 28, 2000 || Socorro || LINEAR || — || align=right | 1.3 km || 
|-id=696 bgcolor=#fefefe
| 160696 ||  || — || May 28, 2000 || Socorro || LINEAR || — || align=right | 1.3 km || 
|-id=697 bgcolor=#fefefe
| 160697 ||  || — || June 4, 2000 || Ondřejov || L. Kotková || FLO || align=right | 2.3 km || 
|-id=698 bgcolor=#fefefe
| 160698 ||  || — || July 4, 2000 || Anderson Mesa || LONEOS || FLO || align=right | 1.3 km || 
|-id=699 bgcolor=#fefefe
| 160699 ||  || — || July 23, 2000 || Socorro || LINEAR || V || align=right | 1.2 km || 
|-id=700 bgcolor=#fefefe
| 160700 ||  || — || July 23, 2000 || Socorro || LINEAR || FLO || align=right | 1.2 km || 
|}

160701–160800 

|-bgcolor=#fefefe
| 160701 ||  || — || July 31, 2000 || Socorro || LINEAR || — || align=right | 1.6 km || 
|-id=702 bgcolor=#fefefe
| 160702 ||  || — || August 2, 2000 || Socorro || LINEAR || — || align=right | 1.6 km || 
|-id=703 bgcolor=#fefefe
| 160703 ||  || — || August 1, 2000 || Socorro || LINEAR || NYS || align=right data-sort-value="0.92" | 920 m || 
|-id=704 bgcolor=#fefefe
| 160704 ||  || — || August 9, 2000 || Socorro || LINEAR || — || align=right | 2.5 km || 
|-id=705 bgcolor=#fefefe
| 160705 ||  || — || August 24, 2000 || Socorro || LINEAR || — || align=right | 2.1 km || 
|-id=706 bgcolor=#fefefe
| 160706 ||  || — || August 24, 2000 || Socorro || LINEAR || — || align=right | 1.3 km || 
|-id=707 bgcolor=#FA8072
| 160707 ||  || — || August 24, 2000 || Socorro || LINEAR || — || align=right | 1.4 km || 
|-id=708 bgcolor=#fefefe
| 160708 ||  || — || August 24, 2000 || Socorro || LINEAR || — || align=right | 2.2 km || 
|-id=709 bgcolor=#fefefe
| 160709 ||  || — || August 25, 2000 || Socorro || LINEAR || — || align=right | 2.0 km || 
|-id=710 bgcolor=#fefefe
| 160710 ||  || — || August 24, 2000 || Socorro || LINEAR || — || align=right | 1.4 km || 
|-id=711 bgcolor=#fefefe
| 160711 ||  || — || August 24, 2000 || Socorro || LINEAR || — || align=right | 2.2 km || 
|-id=712 bgcolor=#fefefe
| 160712 ||  || — || August 25, 2000 || Socorro || LINEAR || V || align=right | 1.4 km || 
|-id=713 bgcolor=#fefefe
| 160713 ||  || — || August 28, 2000 || Socorro || LINEAR || — || align=right | 1.6 km || 
|-id=714 bgcolor=#fefefe
| 160714 ||  || — || August 28, 2000 || Socorro || LINEAR || — || align=right | 1.6 km || 
|-id=715 bgcolor=#d6d6d6
| 160715 ||  || — || August 28, 2000 || Socorro || LINEAR || — || align=right | 6.1 km || 
|-id=716 bgcolor=#fefefe
| 160716 ||  || — || August 29, 2000 || Socorro || LINEAR || — || align=right | 1.2 km || 
|-id=717 bgcolor=#fefefe
| 160717 ||  || — || August 25, 2000 || Socorro || LINEAR || — || align=right | 2.5 km || 
|-id=718 bgcolor=#fefefe
| 160718 ||  || — || August 31, 2000 || Socorro || LINEAR || — || align=right | 2.1 km || 
|-id=719 bgcolor=#fefefe
| 160719 ||  || — || August 26, 2000 || Socorro || LINEAR || — || align=right | 1.5 km || 
|-id=720 bgcolor=#fefefe
| 160720 ||  || — || August 31, 2000 || Socorro || LINEAR || — || align=right | 1.7 km || 
|-id=721 bgcolor=#d6d6d6
| 160721 ||  || — || August 31, 2000 || Socorro || LINEAR || — || align=right | 2.5 km || 
|-id=722 bgcolor=#fefefe
| 160722 ||  || — || August 31, 2000 || Socorro || LINEAR || V || align=right | 1.4 km || 
|-id=723 bgcolor=#fefefe
| 160723 ||  || — || August 31, 2000 || Socorro || LINEAR || — || align=right | 1.4 km || 
|-id=724 bgcolor=#fefefe
| 160724 ||  || — || August 31, 2000 || Socorro || LINEAR || — || align=right | 1.5 km || 
|-id=725 bgcolor=#fefefe
| 160725 ||  || — || August 31, 2000 || Socorro || LINEAR || — || align=right | 1.7 km || 
|-id=726 bgcolor=#fefefe
| 160726 ||  || — || August 31, 2000 || Socorro || LINEAR || — || align=right | 1.7 km || 
|-id=727 bgcolor=#fefefe
| 160727 ||  || — || August 26, 2000 || Socorro || LINEAR || FLO || align=right | 1.1 km || 
|-id=728 bgcolor=#fefefe
| 160728 ||  || — || August 26, 2000 || Socorro || LINEAR || V || align=right | 1.5 km || 
|-id=729 bgcolor=#fefefe
| 160729 ||  || — || August 29, 2000 || Socorro || LINEAR || NYS || align=right | 1.1 km || 
|-id=730 bgcolor=#fefefe
| 160730 ||  || — || August 31, 2000 || Socorro || LINEAR || NYS || align=right | 2.5 km || 
|-id=731 bgcolor=#fefefe
| 160731 ||  || — || August 31, 2000 || Kitt Peak || Spacewatch || — || align=right | 1.4 km || 
|-id=732 bgcolor=#fefefe
| 160732 ||  || — || September 1, 2000 || Socorro || LINEAR || — || align=right | 1.5 km || 
|-id=733 bgcolor=#fefefe
| 160733 ||  || — || September 1, 2000 || Socorro || LINEAR || NYS || align=right | 3.1 km || 
|-id=734 bgcolor=#fefefe
| 160734 ||  || — || September 1, 2000 || Socorro || LINEAR || NYSfast? || align=right | 3.0 km || 
|-id=735 bgcolor=#fefefe
| 160735 ||  || — || September 1, 2000 || Socorro || LINEAR || — || align=right | 2.0 km || 
|-id=736 bgcolor=#fefefe
| 160736 ||  || — || September 1, 2000 || Socorro || LINEAR || V || align=right | 1.5 km || 
|-id=737 bgcolor=#fefefe
| 160737 ||  || — || September 1, 2000 || Socorro || LINEAR || V || align=right | 1.3 km || 
|-id=738 bgcolor=#fefefe
| 160738 ||  || — || September 3, 2000 || Socorro || LINEAR || — || align=right | 2.3 km || 
|-id=739 bgcolor=#fefefe
| 160739 ||  || — || September 5, 2000 || Socorro || LINEAR || — || align=right | 1.7 km || 
|-id=740 bgcolor=#fefefe
| 160740 ||  || — || September 2, 2000 || Socorro || LINEAR || NYS || align=right | 1.2 km || 
|-id=741 bgcolor=#fefefe
| 160741 ||  || — || September 2, 2000 || Socorro || LINEAR || NYS || align=right | 1.3 km || 
|-id=742 bgcolor=#fefefe
| 160742 ||  || — || September 1, 2000 || Socorro || LINEAR || — || align=right | 1.8 km || 
|-id=743 bgcolor=#fefefe
| 160743 ||  || — || September 2, 2000 || Anderson Mesa || LONEOS || — || align=right | 1.4 km || 
|-id=744 bgcolor=#fefefe
| 160744 ||  || — || September 3, 2000 || Socorro || LINEAR || NYS || align=right | 1.1 km || 
|-id=745 bgcolor=#fefefe
| 160745 ||  || — || September 4, 2000 || Haleakala || NEAT || — || align=right | 2.7 km || 
|-id=746 bgcolor=#fefefe
| 160746 ||  || — || September 5, 2000 || Socorro || LINEAR || — || align=right | 1.1 km || 
|-id=747 bgcolor=#fefefe
| 160747 ||  || — || September 23, 2000 || Socorro || LINEAR || — || align=right | 3.2 km || 
|-id=748 bgcolor=#fefefe
| 160748 ||  || — || September 24, 2000 || Socorro || LINEAR || — || align=right | 1.6 km || 
|-id=749 bgcolor=#fefefe
| 160749 ||  || — || September 24, 2000 || Socorro || LINEAR || NYS || align=right | 1.1 km || 
|-id=750 bgcolor=#E9E9E9
| 160750 ||  || — || September 24, 2000 || Socorro || LINEAR || — || align=right | 2.3 km || 
|-id=751 bgcolor=#fefefe
| 160751 ||  || — || September 24, 2000 || Socorro || LINEAR || — || align=right | 1.4 km || 
|-id=752 bgcolor=#fefefe
| 160752 ||  || — || September 24, 2000 || Socorro || LINEAR || — || align=right | 1.4 km || 
|-id=753 bgcolor=#fefefe
| 160753 ||  || — || September 24, 2000 || Socorro || LINEAR || V || align=right | 1.4 km || 
|-id=754 bgcolor=#fefefe
| 160754 ||  || — || September 24, 2000 || Socorro || LINEAR || FLO || align=right | 1.0 km || 
|-id=755 bgcolor=#fefefe
| 160755 ||  || — || September 23, 2000 || Socorro || LINEAR || — || align=right | 1.5 km || 
|-id=756 bgcolor=#fefefe
| 160756 ||  || — || September 23, 2000 || Socorro || LINEAR || V || align=right | 1.4 km || 
|-id=757 bgcolor=#fefefe
| 160757 ||  || — || September 23, 2000 || Socorro || LINEAR || — || align=right | 1.6 km || 
|-id=758 bgcolor=#d6d6d6
| 160758 ||  || — || September 23, 2000 || Socorro || LINEAR || — || align=right | 5.8 km || 
|-id=759 bgcolor=#fefefe
| 160759 ||  || — || September 24, 2000 || Socorro || LINEAR || — || align=right | 1.8 km || 
|-id=760 bgcolor=#fefefe
| 160760 ||  || — || September 24, 2000 || Socorro || LINEAR || NYS || align=right | 2.2 km || 
|-id=761 bgcolor=#FA8072
| 160761 ||  || — || September 24, 2000 || Socorro || LINEAR || — || align=right | 1.4 km || 
|-id=762 bgcolor=#fefefe
| 160762 ||  || — || September 24, 2000 || Socorro || LINEAR || MAS || align=right | 1.2 km || 
|-id=763 bgcolor=#fefefe
| 160763 ||  || — || September 24, 2000 || Socorro || LINEAR || — || align=right | 3.0 km || 
|-id=764 bgcolor=#fefefe
| 160764 ||  || — || September 24, 2000 || Socorro || LINEAR || ERI || align=right | 3.5 km || 
|-id=765 bgcolor=#fefefe
| 160765 ||  || — || September 24, 2000 || Socorro || LINEAR || — || align=right | 1.8 km || 
|-id=766 bgcolor=#d6d6d6
| 160766 ||  || — || September 22, 2000 || Socorro || LINEAR || — || align=right | 4.8 km || 
|-id=767 bgcolor=#fefefe
| 160767 ||  || — || September 23, 2000 || Socorro || LINEAR || — || align=right | 1.6 km || 
|-id=768 bgcolor=#fefefe
| 160768 ||  || — || September 23, 2000 || Socorro || LINEAR || — || align=right | 1.2 km || 
|-id=769 bgcolor=#fefefe
| 160769 ||  || — || September 24, 2000 || Socorro || LINEAR || ERI || align=right | 2.5 km || 
|-id=770 bgcolor=#fefefe
| 160770 ||  || — || September 21, 2000 || Haleakala || NEAT || — || align=right | 2.6 km || 
|-id=771 bgcolor=#d6d6d6
| 160771 ||  || — || September 24, 2000 || Socorro || LINEAR || — || align=right | 3.8 km || 
|-id=772 bgcolor=#E9E9E9
| 160772 ||  || — || September 24, 2000 || Socorro || LINEAR || — || align=right | 1.5 km || 
|-id=773 bgcolor=#fefefe
| 160773 ||  || — || September 24, 2000 || Socorro || LINEAR || MAS || align=right | 1.1 km || 
|-id=774 bgcolor=#fefefe
| 160774 ||  || — || September 26, 2000 || Socorro || LINEAR || — || align=right | 3.5 km || 
|-id=775 bgcolor=#E9E9E9
| 160775 ||  || — || September 24, 2000 || Socorro || LINEAR || — || align=right | 4.8 km || 
|-id=776 bgcolor=#fefefe
| 160776 ||  || — || September 24, 2000 || Socorro || LINEAR || — || align=right | 1.6 km || 
|-id=777 bgcolor=#fefefe
| 160777 ||  || — || September 24, 2000 || Socorro || LINEAR || — || align=right | 1.3 km || 
|-id=778 bgcolor=#fefefe
| 160778 ||  || — || September 24, 2000 || Socorro || LINEAR || NYS || align=right | 2.6 km || 
|-id=779 bgcolor=#fefefe
| 160779 ||  || — || September 24, 2000 || Socorro || LINEAR || — || align=right | 1.1 km || 
|-id=780 bgcolor=#fefefe
| 160780 ||  || — || September 27, 2000 || Socorro || LINEAR || NYS || align=right | 1.2 km || 
|-id=781 bgcolor=#fefefe
| 160781 ||  || — || September 30, 2000 || Socorro || LINEAR || — || align=right | 2.0 km || 
|-id=782 bgcolor=#fefefe
| 160782 ||  || — || September 23, 2000 || Socorro || LINEAR || V || align=right | 1.5 km || 
|-id=783 bgcolor=#fefefe
| 160783 ||  || — || September 27, 2000 || Socorro || LINEAR || — || align=right | 1.5 km || 
|-id=784 bgcolor=#E9E9E9
| 160784 ||  || — || September 29, 2000 || Kitt Peak || Spacewatch || GER || align=right | 3.6 km || 
|-id=785 bgcolor=#fefefe
| 160785 ||  || — || September 25, 2000 || Haleakala || NEAT || NYS || align=right data-sort-value="0.88" | 880 m || 
|-id=786 bgcolor=#fefefe
| 160786 ||  || — || September 29, 2000 || Anderson Mesa || LONEOS || — || align=right | 2.7 km || 
|-id=787 bgcolor=#fefefe
| 160787 ||  || — || September 23, 2000 || Anderson Mesa || LONEOS || — || align=right | 1.3 km || 
|-id=788 bgcolor=#fefefe
| 160788 ||  || — || October 1, 2000 || Socorro || LINEAR || — || align=right | 1.6 km || 
|-id=789 bgcolor=#fefefe
| 160789 ||  || — || October 1, 2000 || Socorro || LINEAR || NYS || align=right | 1.2 km || 
|-id=790 bgcolor=#E9E9E9
| 160790 ||  || — || October 1, 2000 || Socorro || LINEAR || MAR || align=right | 1.5 km || 
|-id=791 bgcolor=#fefefe
| 160791 ||  || — || October 1, 2000 || Socorro || LINEAR || — || align=right | 1.9 km || 
|-id=792 bgcolor=#fefefe
| 160792 ||  || — || October 1, 2000 || Socorro || LINEAR || — || align=right | 1.5 km || 
|-id=793 bgcolor=#fefefe
| 160793 ||  || — || October 1, 2000 || Socorro || LINEAR || V || align=right | 1.5 km || 
|-id=794 bgcolor=#fefefe
| 160794 ||  || — || October 24, 2000 || Socorro || LINEAR || — || align=right | 1.5 km || 
|-id=795 bgcolor=#fefefe
| 160795 ||  || — || October 24, 2000 || Socorro || LINEAR || FLO || align=right | 1.5 km || 
|-id=796 bgcolor=#fefefe
| 160796 ||  || — || October 24, 2000 || Socorro || LINEAR || MAS || align=right | 1.2 km || 
|-id=797 bgcolor=#fefefe
| 160797 ||  || — || October 24, 2000 || Socorro || LINEAR || NYS || align=right | 1.5 km || 
|-id=798 bgcolor=#fefefe
| 160798 ||  || — || October 25, 2000 || Socorro || LINEAR || — || align=right | 2.0 km || 
|-id=799 bgcolor=#fefefe
| 160799 ||  || — || October 25, 2000 || Socorro || LINEAR || CLA || align=right | 2.4 km || 
|-id=800 bgcolor=#fefefe
| 160800 ||  || — || October 25, 2000 || Socorro || LINEAR || NYS || align=right | 1.1 km || 
|}

160801–160900 

|-bgcolor=#fefefe
| 160801 ||  || — || October 24, 2000 || Socorro || LINEAR || NYS || align=right | 1.4 km || 
|-id=802 bgcolor=#fefefe
| 160802 ||  || — || November 1, 2000 || Socorro || LINEAR || — || align=right | 1.5 km || 
|-id=803 bgcolor=#fefefe
| 160803 ||  || — || November 1, 2000 || Socorro || LINEAR || NYS || align=right | 1.0 km || 
|-id=804 bgcolor=#fefefe
| 160804 ||  || — || November 1, 2000 || Socorro || LINEAR || — || align=right | 2.0 km || 
|-id=805 bgcolor=#fefefe
| 160805 ||  || — || November 1, 2000 || Socorro || LINEAR || NYS || align=right | 1.1 km || 
|-id=806 bgcolor=#fefefe
| 160806 ||  || — || November 1, 2000 || Socorro || LINEAR || NYS || align=right | 1.0 km || 
|-id=807 bgcolor=#fefefe
| 160807 ||  || — || November 1, 2000 || Socorro || LINEAR || — || align=right | 3.1 km || 
|-id=808 bgcolor=#fefefe
| 160808 ||  || — || November 3, 2000 || Socorro || LINEAR || — || align=right | 1.6 km || 
|-id=809 bgcolor=#fefefe
| 160809 ||  || — || November 3, 2000 || Socorro || LINEAR || V || align=right | 1.1 km || 
|-id=810 bgcolor=#fefefe
| 160810 ||  || — || November 3, 2000 || Socorro || LINEAR || V || align=right | 1.4 km || 
|-id=811 bgcolor=#fefefe
| 160811 ||  || — || November 3, 2000 || Socorro || LINEAR || — || align=right | 2.4 km || 
|-id=812 bgcolor=#fefefe
| 160812 ||  || — || November 17, 2000 || Socorro || LINEAR || PHO || align=right | 2.5 km || 
|-id=813 bgcolor=#fefefe
| 160813 ||  || — || November 20, 2000 || Socorro || LINEAR || — || align=right | 1.7 km || 
|-id=814 bgcolor=#E9E9E9
| 160814 ||  || — || November 21, 2000 || Socorro || LINEAR || — || align=right | 2.6 km || 
|-id=815 bgcolor=#fefefe
| 160815 ||  || — || November 21, 2000 || Socorro || LINEAR || — || align=right | 3.6 km || 
|-id=816 bgcolor=#fefefe
| 160816 ||  || — || November 19, 2000 || Socorro || LINEAR || — || align=right | 1.7 km || 
|-id=817 bgcolor=#fefefe
| 160817 ||  || — || November 19, 2000 || Socorro || LINEAR || H || align=right | 2.3 km || 
|-id=818 bgcolor=#fefefe
| 160818 ||  || — || November 21, 2000 || Socorro || LINEAR || MAS || align=right | 1.8 km || 
|-id=819 bgcolor=#fefefe
| 160819 ||  || — || November 29, 2000 || Socorro || LINEAR || NYS || align=right | 1.3 km || 
|-id=820 bgcolor=#fefefe
| 160820 ||  || — || November 26, 2000 || Socorro || LINEAR || FLO || align=right | 1.1 km || 
|-id=821 bgcolor=#fefefe
| 160821 ||  || — || November 19, 2000 || Socorro || LINEAR || V || align=right | 1.3 km || 
|-id=822 bgcolor=#fefefe
| 160822 ||  || — || November 28, 2000 || Kitt Peak || Spacewatch || — || align=right | 1.3 km || 
|-id=823 bgcolor=#fefefe
| 160823 ||  || — || November 27, 2000 || Socorro || LINEAR || ERI || align=right | 3.0 km || 
|-id=824 bgcolor=#fefefe
| 160824 ||  || — || November 29, 2000 || Socorro || LINEAR || V || align=right | 1.2 km || 
|-id=825 bgcolor=#fefefe
| 160825 ||  || — || November 20, 2000 || Socorro || LINEAR || V || align=right | 1.9 km || 
|-id=826 bgcolor=#d6d6d6
| 160826 ||  || — || December 1, 2000 || Socorro || LINEAR || HIL || align=right | 8.4 km || 
|-id=827 bgcolor=#fefefe
| 160827 ||  || — || December 1, 2000 || Socorro || LINEAR || — || align=right | 2.1 km || 
|-id=828 bgcolor=#E9E9E9
| 160828 ||  || — || December 4, 2000 || Socorro || LINEAR || MAR || align=right | 2.0 km || 
|-id=829 bgcolor=#fefefe
| 160829 ||  || — || December 4, 2000 || Socorro || LINEAR || — || align=right | 1.5 km || 
|-id=830 bgcolor=#E9E9E9
| 160830 ||  || — || December 4, 2000 || Socorro || LINEAR || — || align=right | 3.3 km || 
|-id=831 bgcolor=#E9E9E9
| 160831 ||  || — || December 4, 2000 || Socorro || LINEAR || — || align=right | 3.4 km || 
|-id=832 bgcolor=#fefefe
| 160832 ||  || — || December 19, 2000 || Haleakala || NEAT || PHO || align=right | 2.5 km || 
|-id=833 bgcolor=#d6d6d6
| 160833 ||  || — || December 25, 2000 || Kitt Peak || Spacewatch || — || align=right | 4.3 km || 
|-id=834 bgcolor=#fefefe
| 160834 ||  || — || December 30, 2000 || Socorro || LINEAR || — || align=right | 2.2 km || 
|-id=835 bgcolor=#fefefe
| 160835 ||  || — || December 30, 2000 || Socorro || LINEAR || — || align=right | 1.9 km || 
|-id=836 bgcolor=#E9E9E9
| 160836 ||  || — || December 28, 2000 || Socorro || LINEAR || DOR || align=right | 5.8 km || 
|-id=837 bgcolor=#fefefe
| 160837 ||  || — || December 30, 2000 || Socorro || LINEAR || — || align=right | 1.6 km || 
|-id=838 bgcolor=#fefefe
| 160838 ||  || — || December 30, 2000 || Socorro || LINEAR || — || align=right | 1.4 km || 
|-id=839 bgcolor=#E9E9E9
| 160839 ||  || — || December 30, 2000 || Socorro || LINEAR || EUN || align=right | 5.2 km || 
|-id=840 bgcolor=#fefefe
| 160840 ||  || — || December 30, 2000 || Socorro || LINEAR || NYS || align=right | 1.4 km || 
|-id=841 bgcolor=#E9E9E9
| 160841 ||  || — || December 30, 2000 || Socorro || LINEAR || — || align=right | 3.3 km || 
|-id=842 bgcolor=#d6d6d6
| 160842 ||  || — || December 21, 2000 || Kitt Peak || DLS || EOS || align=right | 3.1 km || 
|-id=843 bgcolor=#E9E9E9
| 160843 ||  || — || January 3, 2001 || Socorro || LINEAR || — || align=right | 2.8 km || 
|-id=844 bgcolor=#E9E9E9
| 160844 ||  || — || January 15, 2001 || Socorro || LINEAR || — || align=right | 5.3 km || 
|-id=845 bgcolor=#fefefe
| 160845 ||  || — || January 4, 2001 || Socorro || LINEAR || H || align=right data-sort-value="0.93" | 930 m || 
|-id=846 bgcolor=#E9E9E9
| 160846 ||  || — || January 19, 2001 || Socorro || LINEAR || — || align=right | 1.6 km || 
|-id=847 bgcolor=#fefefe
| 160847 ||  || — || January 31, 2001 || Socorro || LINEAR || H || align=right | 1.3 km || 
|-id=848 bgcolor=#fefefe
| 160848 ||  || — || January 19, 2001 || Mauna Kea || D. J. Tholen || — || align=right | 1.1 km || 
|-id=849 bgcolor=#E9E9E9
| 160849 ||  || — || February 1, 2001 || Socorro || LINEAR || — || align=right | 2.5 km || 
|-id=850 bgcolor=#fefefe
| 160850 ||  || — || February 2, 2001 || Socorro || LINEAR || H || align=right | 1.1 km || 
|-id=851 bgcolor=#fefefe
| 160851 ||  || — || February 15, 2001 || Socorro || LINEAR || H || align=right | 1.2 km || 
|-id=852 bgcolor=#E9E9E9
| 160852 ||  || — || February 15, 2001 || Socorro || LINEAR || WAT || align=right | 3.8 km || 
|-id=853 bgcolor=#E9E9E9
| 160853 ||  || — || February 17, 2001 || Socorro || LINEAR || — || align=right | 2.6 km || 
|-id=854 bgcolor=#fefefe
| 160854 ||  || — || February 17, 2001 || Socorro || LINEAR || — || align=right | 2.0 km || 
|-id=855 bgcolor=#E9E9E9
| 160855 ||  || — || February 26, 2001 || Oizumi || T. Kobayashi || EUN || align=right | 3.2 km || 
|-id=856 bgcolor=#C2FFFF
| 160856 ||  || — || February 19, 2001 || Anderson Mesa || LONEOS || L4ERY || align=right | 16 km || 
|-id=857 bgcolor=#d6d6d6
| 160857 ||  || — || March 15, 2001 || Anderson Mesa || LONEOS || YAK || align=right | 4.4 km || 
|-id=858 bgcolor=#d6d6d6
| 160858 ||  || — || March 26, 2001 || Socorro || LINEAR || — || align=right | 4.6 km || 
|-id=859 bgcolor=#d6d6d6
| 160859 ||  || — || March 23, 2001 || Anderson Mesa || LONEOS || — || align=right | 4.6 km || 
|-id=860 bgcolor=#E9E9E9
| 160860 ||  || — || March 23, 2001 || Haleakala || NEAT || — || align=right | 3.9 km || 
|-id=861 bgcolor=#d6d6d6
| 160861 ||  || — || March 16, 2001 || Socorro || LINEAR || — || align=right | 4.9 km || 
|-id=862 bgcolor=#d6d6d6
| 160862 ||  || — || April 15, 2001 || Socorro || LINEAR || — || align=right | 5.6 km || 
|-id=863 bgcolor=#d6d6d6
| 160863 ||  || — || April 26, 2001 || Socorro || LINEAR || — || align=right | 5.2 km || 
|-id=864 bgcolor=#fefefe
| 160864 ||  || — || April 23, 2001 || Socorro || LINEAR || V || align=right | 1.3 km || 
|-id=865 bgcolor=#d6d6d6
| 160865 ||  || — || May 15, 2001 || Kitt Peak || Spacewatch || TEL || align=right | 2.4 km || 
|-id=866 bgcolor=#d6d6d6
| 160866 ||  || — || May 18, 2001 || Socorro || LINEAR || — || align=right | 5.0 km || 
|-id=867 bgcolor=#fefefe
| 160867 ||  || — || May 17, 2001 || Socorro || LINEAR || FLO || align=right data-sort-value="0.95" | 950 m || 
|-id=868 bgcolor=#E9E9E9
| 160868 ||  || — || May 24, 2001 || Kitt Peak || Spacewatch || — || align=right | 1.6 km || 
|-id=869 bgcolor=#d6d6d6
| 160869 ||  || — || May 22, 2001 || Socorro || LINEAR || Tj (2.96) || align=right | 8.8 km || 
|-id=870 bgcolor=#d6d6d6
| 160870 ||  || — || May 22, 2001 || Socorro || LINEAR || LIX || align=right | 7.3 km || 
|-id=871 bgcolor=#d6d6d6
| 160871 ||  || — || May 22, 2001 || Socorro || LINEAR || — || align=right | 6.8 km || 
|-id=872 bgcolor=#E9E9E9
| 160872 ||  || — || July 11, 2001 || Palomar || NEAT || JUN || align=right | 2.1 km || 
|-id=873 bgcolor=#d6d6d6
| 160873 ||  || — || July 14, 2001 || Palomar || NEAT || — || align=right | 7.3 km || 
|-id=874 bgcolor=#d6d6d6
| 160874 ||  || — || July 12, 2001 || Haleakala || NEAT || — || align=right | 9.2 km || 
|-id=875 bgcolor=#d6d6d6
| 160875 ||  || — || July 21, 2001 || Anderson Mesa || LONEOS || 7:4 || align=right | 8.2 km || 
|-id=876 bgcolor=#E9E9E9
| 160876 ||  || — || July 23, 2001 || Palomar || NEAT || — || align=right | 3.4 km || 
|-id=877 bgcolor=#d6d6d6
| 160877 ||  || — || July 26, 2001 || Palomar || NEAT || EUP || align=right | 8.4 km || 
|-id=878 bgcolor=#d6d6d6
| 160878 ||  || — || July 27, 2001 || Palomar || NEAT || — || align=right | 9.3 km || 
|-id=879 bgcolor=#fefefe
| 160879 ||  || — || July 27, 2001 || Anderson Mesa || LONEOS || FLO || align=right | 1.3 km || 
|-id=880 bgcolor=#d6d6d6
| 160880 ||  || — || August 8, 2001 || Haleakala || NEAT || — || align=right | 8.0 km || 
|-id=881 bgcolor=#d6d6d6
| 160881 ||  || — || August 12, 2001 || Palomar || NEAT || — || align=right | 7.1 km || 
|-id=882 bgcolor=#d6d6d6
| 160882 ||  || — || August 15, 2001 || Badlands || Badlands Obs. || HYG || align=right | 5.9 km || 
|-id=883 bgcolor=#d6d6d6
| 160883 ||  || — || August 16, 2001 || Socorro || LINEAR || — || align=right | 9.1 km || 
|-id=884 bgcolor=#d6d6d6
| 160884 ||  || — || August 16, 2001 || Socorro || LINEAR || HYG || align=right | 6.3 km || 
|-id=885 bgcolor=#E9E9E9
| 160885 ||  || — || August 24, 2001 || Palomar || NEAT || — || align=right | 2.1 km || 
|-id=886 bgcolor=#FA8072
| 160886 ||  || — || August 22, 2001 || Socorro || LINEAR || — || align=right | 1.9 km || 
|-id=887 bgcolor=#d6d6d6
| 160887 ||  || — || August 24, 2001 || Anderson Mesa || LONEOS || THM || align=right | 4.4 km || 
|-id=888 bgcolor=#d6d6d6
| 160888 ||  || — || August 25, 2001 || Socorro || LINEAR || SYL7:4 || align=right | 6.6 km || 
|-id=889 bgcolor=#fefefe
| 160889 ||  || — || August 19, 2001 || Socorro || LINEAR || V || align=right | 1.2 km || 
|-id=890 bgcolor=#d6d6d6
| 160890 ||  || — || August 19, 2001 || Anderson Mesa || LONEOS || 7:4 || align=right | 8.7 km || 
|-id=891 bgcolor=#fefefe
| 160891 ||  || — || September 11, 2001 || Anderson Mesa || LONEOS || — || align=right | 1.4 km || 
|-id=892 bgcolor=#fefefe
| 160892 ||  || — || September 12, 2001 || Socorro || LINEAR || — || align=right | 1.5 km || 
|-id=893 bgcolor=#fefefe
| 160893 ||  || — || September 12, 2001 || Socorro || LINEAR || — || align=right | 1.2 km || 
|-id=894 bgcolor=#E9E9E9
| 160894 ||  || — || September 20, 2001 || Socorro || LINEAR || — || align=right | 1.5 km || 
|-id=895 bgcolor=#FA8072
| 160895 ||  || — || September 20, 2001 || Socorro || LINEAR || — || align=right | 1.4 km || 
|-id=896 bgcolor=#fefefe
| 160896 ||  || — || September 19, 2001 || Socorro || LINEAR || — || align=right | 1.1 km || 
|-id=897 bgcolor=#fefefe
| 160897 ||  || — || September 19, 2001 || Socorro || LINEAR || — || align=right | 1.1 km || 
|-id=898 bgcolor=#FA8072
| 160898 ||  || — || September 24, 2001 || Socorro || LINEAR || H || align=right data-sort-value="0.96" | 960 m || 
|-id=899 bgcolor=#E9E9E9
| 160899 ||  || — || September 22, 2001 || Palomar || NEAT || — || align=right | 2.9 km || 
|-id=900 bgcolor=#E9E9E9
| 160900 ||  || — || September 21, 2001 || Socorro || LINEAR || — || align=right | 1.9 km || 
|}

160901–161000 

|-bgcolor=#E9E9E9
| 160901 ||  || — || September 21, 2001 || Socorro || LINEAR || — || align=right | 1.4 km || 
|-id=902 bgcolor=#E9E9E9
| 160902 ||  || — || September 21, 2001 || Anderson Mesa || LONEOS || — || align=right | 3.8 km || 
|-id=903 bgcolor=#E9E9E9
| 160903 Shiokaze ||  ||  || October 14, 2001 || Kuma Kogen || A. Nakamura || — || align=right | 1.8 km || 
|-id=904 bgcolor=#E9E9E9
| 160904 ||  || — || October 15, 2001 || Socorro || LINEAR || — || align=right | 1.7 km || 
|-id=905 bgcolor=#fefefe
| 160905 ||  || — || October 11, 2001 || Palomar || NEAT || NYS || align=right | 1.3 km || 
|-id=906 bgcolor=#fefefe
| 160906 ||  || — || October 23, 2001 || Desert Eagle || W. K. Y. Yeung || — || align=right | 1.4 km || 
|-id=907 bgcolor=#fefefe
| 160907 ||  || — || October 18, 2001 || Kitt Peak || Spacewatch || — || align=right | 1.2 km || 
|-id=908 bgcolor=#fefefe
| 160908 ||  || — || October 23, 2001 || Socorro || LINEAR || — || align=right | 1.1 km || 
|-id=909 bgcolor=#E9E9E9
| 160909 ||  || — || October 24, 2001 || Socorro || LINEAR || — || align=right | 3.0 km || 
|-id=910 bgcolor=#E9E9E9
| 160910 ||  || — || November 9, 2001 || Socorro || LINEAR || AGN || align=right | 2.1 km || 
|-id=911 bgcolor=#fefefe
| 160911 ||  || — || November 10, 2001 || Socorro || LINEAR || — || align=right | 1.2 km || 
|-id=912 bgcolor=#fefefe
| 160912 ||  || — || November 17, 2001 || Socorro || LINEAR || — || align=right | 1.3 km || 
|-id=913 bgcolor=#fefefe
| 160913 ||  || — || November 16, 2001 || Palomar || NEAT || FLO || align=right | 1.5 km || 
|-id=914 bgcolor=#E9E9E9
| 160914 ||  || — || December 9, 2001 || Socorro || LINEAR || — || align=right | 2.4 km || 
|-id=915 bgcolor=#fefefe
| 160915 ||  || — || December 9, 2001 || Socorro || LINEAR || — || align=right | 1.6 km || 
|-id=916 bgcolor=#d6d6d6
| 160916 ||  || — || December 9, 2001 || Socorro || LINEAR || — || align=right | 5.2 km || 
|-id=917 bgcolor=#E9E9E9
| 160917 ||  || — || December 11, 2001 || Socorro || LINEAR || AEO || align=right | 2.0 km || 
|-id=918 bgcolor=#d6d6d6
| 160918 ||  || — || December 14, 2001 || Desert Eagle || W. K. Y. Yeung || — || align=right | 5.6 km || 
|-id=919 bgcolor=#fefefe
| 160919 ||  || — || December 10, 2001 || Socorro || LINEAR || — || align=right | 1.5 km || 
|-id=920 bgcolor=#d6d6d6
| 160920 ||  || — || December 11, 2001 || Socorro || LINEAR || — || align=right | 5.7 km || 
|-id=921 bgcolor=#fefefe
| 160921 ||  || — || December 13, 2001 || Socorro || LINEAR || — || align=right | 1.8 km || 
|-id=922 bgcolor=#fefefe
| 160922 ||  || — || December 13, 2001 || Socorro || LINEAR || — || align=right | 1.8 km || 
|-id=923 bgcolor=#E9E9E9
| 160923 ||  || — || December 14, 2001 || Socorro || LINEAR || — || align=right | 4.1 km || 
|-id=924 bgcolor=#fefefe
| 160924 ||  || — || December 14, 2001 || Socorro || LINEAR || FLO || align=right | 1.0 km || 
|-id=925 bgcolor=#fefefe
| 160925 ||  || — || December 14, 2001 || Socorro || LINEAR || — || align=right | 1.6 km || 
|-id=926 bgcolor=#fefefe
| 160926 ||  || — || December 14, 2001 || Socorro || LINEAR || — || align=right | 1.9 km || 
|-id=927 bgcolor=#fefefe
| 160927 ||  || — || December 14, 2001 || Socorro || LINEAR || — || align=right | 1.5 km || 
|-id=928 bgcolor=#E9E9E9
| 160928 ||  || — || December 15, 2001 || Socorro || LINEAR || — || align=right | 5.8 km || 
|-id=929 bgcolor=#E9E9E9
| 160929 ||  || — || December 15, 2001 || Socorro || LINEAR || — || align=right | 2.6 km || 
|-id=930 bgcolor=#fefefe
| 160930 ||  || — || December 14, 2001 || Socorro || LINEAR || V || align=right | 1.3 km || 
|-id=931 bgcolor=#fefefe
| 160931 ||  || — || December 14, 2001 || Kitt Peak || Spacewatch || — || align=right | 1.6 km || 
|-id=932 bgcolor=#fefefe
| 160932 || 2001 YO || — || December 16, 2001 || Oaxaca || J. M. Roe || — || align=right | 1.6 km || 
|-id=933 bgcolor=#E9E9E9
| 160933 ||  || — || December 18, 2001 || Socorro || LINEAR || — || align=right | 2.7 km || 
|-id=934 bgcolor=#fefefe
| 160934 ||  || — || December 18, 2001 || Socorro || LINEAR || FLO || align=right | 1.4 km || 
|-id=935 bgcolor=#fefefe
| 160935 ||  || — || December 18, 2001 || Socorro || LINEAR || — || align=right | 1.5 km || 
|-id=936 bgcolor=#fefefe
| 160936 ||  || — || December 18, 2001 || Socorro || LINEAR || FLO || align=right | 1.4 km || 
|-id=937 bgcolor=#fefefe
| 160937 ||  || — || December 18, 2001 || Socorro || LINEAR || — || align=right | 3.1 km || 
|-id=938 bgcolor=#fefefe
| 160938 ||  || — || December 17, 2001 || Socorro || LINEAR || NYS || align=right | 1.5 km || 
|-id=939 bgcolor=#fefefe
| 160939 ||  || — || January 3, 2002 || Socorro || LINEAR || H || align=right | 1.8 km || 
|-id=940 bgcolor=#E9E9E9
| 160940 ||  || — || January 9, 2002 || Oizumi || T. Kobayashi || — || align=right | 1.5 km || 
|-id=941 bgcolor=#d6d6d6
| 160941 ||  || — || January 11, 2002 || Desert Eagle || W. K. Y. Yeung || — || align=right | 5.5 km || 
|-id=942 bgcolor=#fefefe
| 160942 ||  || — || January 12, 2002 || Kitt Peak || Spacewatch || MAS || align=right | 1.6 km || 
|-id=943 bgcolor=#fefefe
| 160943 ||  || — || January 10, 2002 || Palomar || NEAT || FLO || align=right | 1.6 km || 
|-id=944 bgcolor=#E9E9E9
| 160944 ||  || — || January 9, 2002 || Socorro || LINEAR || AGN || align=right | 1.9 km || 
|-id=945 bgcolor=#d6d6d6
| 160945 ||  || — || January 9, 2002 || Socorro || LINEAR || — || align=right | 6.4 km || 
|-id=946 bgcolor=#fefefe
| 160946 ||  || — || January 9, 2002 || Socorro || LINEAR || FLO || align=right | 1.0 km || 
|-id=947 bgcolor=#fefefe
| 160947 ||  || — || January 9, 2002 || Socorro || LINEAR || FLO || align=right | 1.4 km || 
|-id=948 bgcolor=#fefefe
| 160948 ||  || — || January 8, 2002 || Socorro || LINEAR || — || align=right | 1.2 km || 
|-id=949 bgcolor=#fefefe
| 160949 ||  || — || January 8, 2002 || Socorro || LINEAR || KLI || align=right | 3.9 km || 
|-id=950 bgcolor=#d6d6d6
| 160950 ||  || — || January 9, 2002 || Socorro || LINEAR || — || align=right | 4.1 km || 
|-id=951 bgcolor=#fefefe
| 160951 ||  || — || January 9, 2002 || Socorro || LINEAR || FLO || align=right | 1.2 km || 
|-id=952 bgcolor=#fefefe
| 160952 ||  || — || January 9, 2002 || Socorro || LINEAR || FLO || align=right | 1.4 km || 
|-id=953 bgcolor=#fefefe
| 160953 ||  || — || January 9, 2002 || Socorro || LINEAR || — || align=right | 1.5 km || 
|-id=954 bgcolor=#fefefe
| 160954 ||  || — || January 9, 2002 || Socorro || LINEAR || FLO || align=right | 1.5 km || 
|-id=955 bgcolor=#fefefe
| 160955 ||  || — || January 13, 2002 || Socorro || LINEAR || — || align=right | 1.5 km || 
|-id=956 bgcolor=#E9E9E9
| 160956 ||  || — || January 15, 2002 || Kingsnake || J. V. McClusky || GAL || align=right | 2.4 km || 
|-id=957 bgcolor=#fefefe
| 160957 ||  || — || January 13, 2002 || Socorro || LINEAR || NYS || align=right | 1.0 km || 
|-id=958 bgcolor=#fefefe
| 160958 ||  || — || January 13, 2002 || Socorro || LINEAR || — || align=right | 1.6 km || 
|-id=959 bgcolor=#fefefe
| 160959 ||  || — || January 13, 2002 || Socorro || LINEAR || V || align=right | 1.3 km || 
|-id=960 bgcolor=#fefefe
| 160960 ||  || — || January 13, 2002 || Socorro || LINEAR || FLO || align=right | 1.4 km || 
|-id=961 bgcolor=#fefefe
| 160961 ||  || — || January 14, 2002 || Socorro || LINEAR || V || align=right | 1.3 km || 
|-id=962 bgcolor=#E9E9E9
| 160962 ||  || — || January 5, 2002 || Palomar || NEAT || — || align=right | 3.8 km || 
|-id=963 bgcolor=#fefefe
| 160963 ||  || — || January 5, 2002 || Palomar || NEAT || FLO || align=right | 1.1 km || 
|-id=964 bgcolor=#fefefe
| 160964 ||  || — || January 8, 2002 || Palomar || NEAT || — || align=right | 1.4 km || 
|-id=965 bgcolor=#E9E9E9
| 160965 ||  || — || January 19, 2002 || Anderson Mesa || LONEOS || — || align=right | 2.8 km || 
|-id=966 bgcolor=#E9E9E9
| 160966 ||  || — || January 18, 2002 || Socorro || LINEAR || ADE || align=right | 3.7 km || 
|-id=967 bgcolor=#fefefe
| 160967 ||  || — || January 19, 2002 || Socorro || LINEAR || LCI || align=right | 1.6 km || 
|-id=968 bgcolor=#E9E9E9
| 160968 ||  || — || January 23, 2002 || Socorro || LINEAR || — || align=right | 4.0 km || 
|-id=969 bgcolor=#E9E9E9
| 160969 ||  || — || January 23, 2002 || Socorro || LINEAR || — || align=right | 4.9 km || 
|-id=970 bgcolor=#fefefe
| 160970 ||  || — || February 6, 2002 || Socorro || LINEAR || H || align=right | 1.5 km || 
|-id=971 bgcolor=#E9E9E9
| 160971 ||  || — || February 8, 2002 || Desert Eagle || W. K. Y. Yeung || — || align=right | 4.4 km || 
|-id=972 bgcolor=#fefefe
| 160972 ||  || — || February 6, 2002 || Palomar || NEAT || V || align=right | 1.2 km || 
|-id=973 bgcolor=#fefefe
| 160973 ||  || — || February 6, 2002 || Socorro || LINEAR || PHO || align=right | 2.4 km || 
|-id=974 bgcolor=#E9E9E9
| 160974 ||  || — || February 7, 2002 || Socorro || LINEAR || — || align=right | 1.6 km || 
|-id=975 bgcolor=#fefefe
| 160975 ||  || — || February 7, 2002 || Socorro || LINEAR || V || align=right | 1.5 km || 
|-id=976 bgcolor=#fefefe
| 160976 ||  || — || February 7, 2002 || Socorro || LINEAR || NYS || align=right | 1.7 km || 
|-id=977 bgcolor=#E9E9E9
| 160977 ||  || — || February 12, 2002 || Desert Eagle || W. K. Y. Yeung || — || align=right | 3.5 km || 
|-id=978 bgcolor=#fefefe
| 160978 ||  || — || February 6, 2002 || Socorro || LINEAR || — || align=right | 4.2 km || 
|-id=979 bgcolor=#fefefe
| 160979 ||  || — || February 7, 2002 || Socorro || LINEAR || V || align=right | 1.2 km || 
|-id=980 bgcolor=#d6d6d6
| 160980 ||  || — || February 7, 2002 || Socorro || LINEAR || — || align=right | 3.9 km || 
|-id=981 bgcolor=#d6d6d6
| 160981 ||  || — || February 7, 2002 || Socorro || LINEAR || — || align=right | 3.1 km || 
|-id=982 bgcolor=#fefefe
| 160982 ||  || — || February 7, 2002 || Socorro || LINEAR || — || align=right | 1.8 km || 
|-id=983 bgcolor=#E9E9E9
| 160983 ||  || — || February 7, 2002 || Socorro || LINEAR || — || align=right | 1.6 km || 
|-id=984 bgcolor=#fefefe
| 160984 ||  || — || February 7, 2002 || Socorro || LINEAR || — || align=right | 1.8 km || 
|-id=985 bgcolor=#fefefe
| 160985 ||  || — || February 7, 2002 || Socorro || LINEAR || — || align=right | 1.6 km || 
|-id=986 bgcolor=#fefefe
| 160986 ||  || — || February 8, 2002 || Socorro || LINEAR || — || align=right | 1.7 km || 
|-id=987 bgcolor=#fefefe
| 160987 ||  || — || February 6, 2002 || Socorro || LINEAR || — || align=right | 5.3 km || 
|-id=988 bgcolor=#fefefe
| 160988 ||  || — || February 7, 2002 || Socorro || LINEAR || — || align=right | 1.4 km || 
|-id=989 bgcolor=#fefefe
| 160989 ||  || — || February 9, 2002 || Socorro || LINEAR || — || align=right | 1.3 km || 
|-id=990 bgcolor=#E9E9E9
| 160990 ||  || — || February 8, 2002 || Socorro || LINEAR || — || align=right | 1.8 km || 
|-id=991 bgcolor=#E9E9E9
| 160991 ||  || — || February 8, 2002 || Socorro || LINEAR || — || align=right | 4.7 km || 
|-id=992 bgcolor=#fefefe
| 160992 ||  || — || February 10, 2002 || Socorro || LINEAR || NYS || align=right | 1.3 km || 
|-id=993 bgcolor=#d6d6d6
| 160993 ||  || — || February 10, 2002 || Socorro || LINEAR || KOR || align=right | 2.3 km || 
|-id=994 bgcolor=#d6d6d6
| 160994 ||  || — || February 10, 2002 || Socorro || LINEAR || — || align=right | 4.3 km || 
|-id=995 bgcolor=#fefefe
| 160995 ||  || — || February 10, 2002 || Socorro || LINEAR || — || align=right | 1.6 km || 
|-id=996 bgcolor=#fefefe
| 160996 ||  || — || February 11, 2002 || Socorro || LINEAR || — || align=right | 2.0 km || 
|-id=997 bgcolor=#d6d6d6
| 160997 ||  || — || February 5, 2002 || Palomar || NEAT || — || align=right | 2.7 km || 
|-id=998 bgcolor=#fefefe
| 160998 ||  || — || February 6, 2002 || Goodricke-Pigott || Goodricke-Pigott Obs. || FLO || align=right | 1.1 km || 
|-id=999 bgcolor=#d6d6d6
| 160999 ||  || — || February 10, 2002 || Socorro || LINEAR || — || align=right | 3.1 km || 
|-id=000 bgcolor=#fefefe
| 161000 ||  || — || February 12, 2002 || Socorro || LINEAR || NYS || align=right | 1.2 km || 
|}

References

External links 
 Discovery Circumstances: Numbered Minor Planets (160001)–(165000) (IAU Minor Planet Center)

0160